= Clement Ogaja =

Kenyan author and researcher

- Ogaja in 2026
- Born: 1972 (age 53–54); Kenya
- Education: University of Nairobi (BSc); UNSW Sydney (PhD)
- Scientific career
- Fields: Geomatics, Positioning, GPS, Geodesy, Satellite Navigation
- Workplaces: National Oceanic and Atmospheric Administration; California State University; Geoscience Australia

Clement Argwings Ogaja (born 1972) is a Kenyan-born author and research geodesist at the National Oceanic and Atmospheric Administration. Previously, he was a professor of geomatics engineering at California State University, Fresno, having also worked at Geoscience Australia in Canberra.

== Education and career ==
He earned his BSc (First Class) in surveying (geomatics) from the University of Nairobi in 1997, before moving to Australia where he studied for a PhD at UNSW Sydney. He completed his PhD in 2002, working on structural health monitoring of engineering structures, such as suspension bridges and tall buildings, using global positioning system.

After his PhD, Ogaja worked at Geoscience Australia before joining California State University, Fresno in 2007 as an assistant professor. He also worked for GPS companies and wrote books and articles on GPS and geomatics engineering.

In 2018, he collaborated with international colleagues and geomatics professionals to advance an initiative on global navigation satellite systems (GNSS) infrastructure in Africa, advocating for a continent-wide online map of Continuously Operating Reference Stations (CORS) to support geodetic and real-time positioning applications.

== Notable works ==
- Applied GPS for Engineers and Project Managers. Reston: ASCE Press. 2011. ISBN 978-0-784-41150-6.
- Geomatics Engineering: A Practical Guide to Project Design. New York: CRC Press. 2016. ISBN 978-1-439-89511-5.
- Geomatics Engineering: A Practical Guide to Project Design. New York: CRC Press. 2020. ISBN 978-0-367-86565-8.
- Introduction to GNSS Geodesy: Foundations of Precise Positioning Using Global Navigation Satellite Systems. Cham, Switzerland: Springer International Publishing AG. 2022. ISBN 978-3-030-91821-7.
- Project Design for Geomatics Engineers and Surveyors. Boca Raton: CRC Press. 2023. ISBN 978-1-003-29714-7.
- An Introduction to GNSS Geodesy and Applications. Cham, Switzerland: Springer. 2024. ISBN 978-3-031-74494-5.
- An Introduction to GNSS Geodesy and Applications. Cham, Switzerland: Springer. 2025. ISBN 978-3-031-74493-8.
