= Surveying in North America =

Survey methods in North America

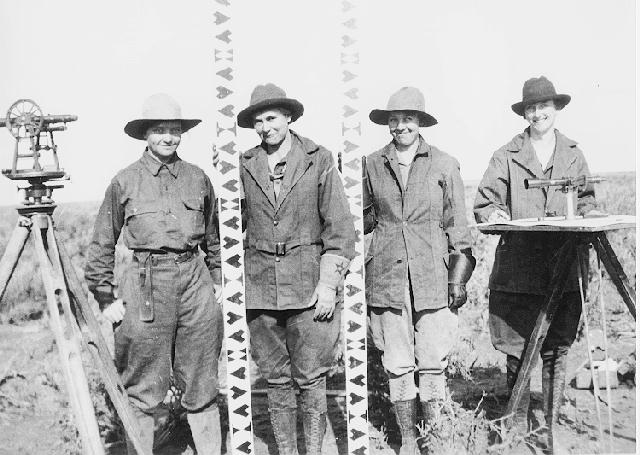
Surveyors on the Minidoka Project in Idaho, 1918. The project controlled the flow of the Snake river with a series of dams and canals.

Surveying in North America is heavily influenced by the United States Public lands survey system. It inherits the basis of its land tenure from the United Kingdom, as well as the other countries that established colonies, namely Spain and France.

== History ==
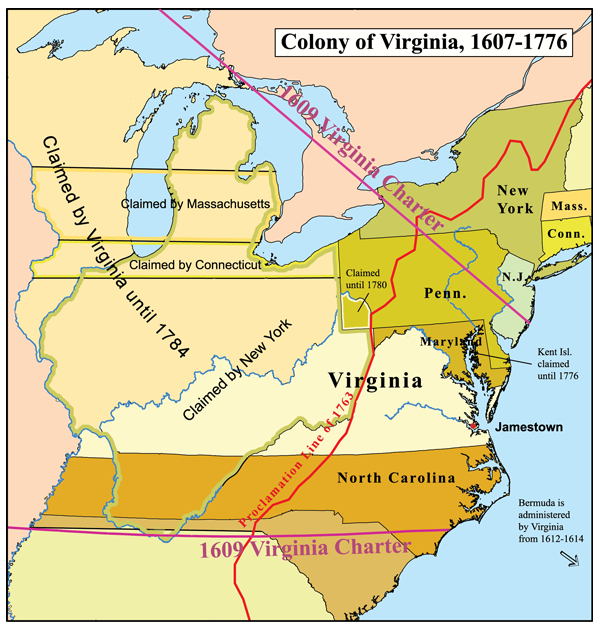
Map of North America showing historical claims for the Colony of Virginia

The first European Explorations of North America were quickly followed by territorial claims. The original colonies that made up the United States were granted royal charters that described the limits of the lands where the settlements could be located. Since much of the lands were unknown to Europeans, the grants allocated sweeping areas and were often later amended or superseded. As the population grew and the land was explored, the state borders were defined, like the Mason–Dixon line, finalized in 1767.

The Lewis and Clark Expedition included a preliminary survey of the features of the western United States, resulting in maps of geographical features.

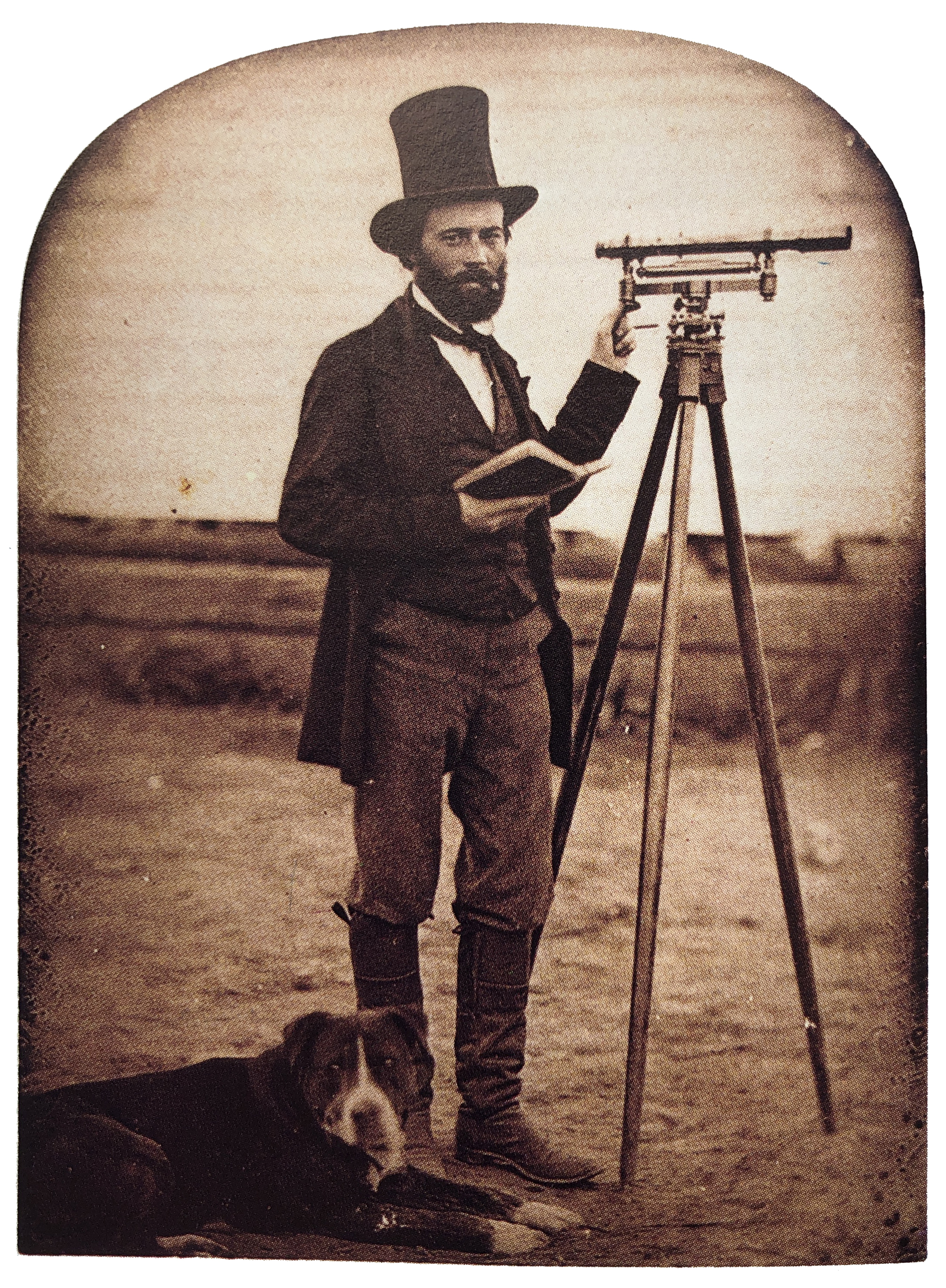
Surveyor in the field, ca. 1854

== Organization ==
The current geodetic model of the Earth used in the US is the North American Datum 1983, often called NAD83. The system is used to define horizontal co-ordinates of reference markers all over the US. Although created as a geocentric datum which originates at the center of the Earth, more recent models of the Earth have shown the origin to be 2.2 m off the center of the Earth. Elevation is recorded against the North American Vertical Datum 1988 (NAVD 88), which uses as its origin point Father Point, in Quebec, Canada. Error in the system is approximately 0.5 mm per mile, resulting in a total error of approximately 1 m from one corner of the continental US to the other.

North American bearings are quadrant bearings.

=== Licensing ===
Licensing requirements vary with jurisdiction, and are commonly consistent within national borders.

==== Canada ====
Land surveyors register to work in their respective province. The designation for a land surveyor breaks down by province. It follows the rule whereby the first letter indicates the province, followed by L.S. There is also a designation C.L.S. or Canada lands surveyor. They have the authority to work on Canada lands, which include Indian Reserves, National Parks, the three territories, and offshore lands. The Canadian version of the PLSS is the Dominion Land Survey.

In Canada, most provinces have Common Law legal systems for the management and regulation of land and personal property being a former dominion of the British Empire, while in Quebec, a mixed legal system also combines a large amount of Civil Law and traditions in dealing with property going back to its founding and subsequent expansion as the central hub of New France.

NRCan's Geodetic Survey Division, also known as Canadian Geodetic Survey, is responsible for maintaining the Canadian Spatial Reference System.

==== Mexico ====
The public land survey systems carried out and maintained in the United States and Canada have influenced and affected how the modern Mexican government licenses and regulates surveying, and how it has undertaken the monumental task of the physical surveying, mapping, and cataloging of public and private land throughout the country.

Mexico has a land surveying system based upon Civil Law, inherited from the Colonial expansion starting with the first exploration and campaigns of the Conquistadors, right through to the wave of settlement coming over from Spain, and as such certain rights differ and are looked at dissimilarly with respect to private and personal property compared to countries with English Common Law systems such as the United States. It is the same source and tradition of some of the civil and land laws found throughout the states in the Southwestern United States, themselves being formerly part of the sparsely populated frontier territory of the Spanish Empire.

==== United States ====
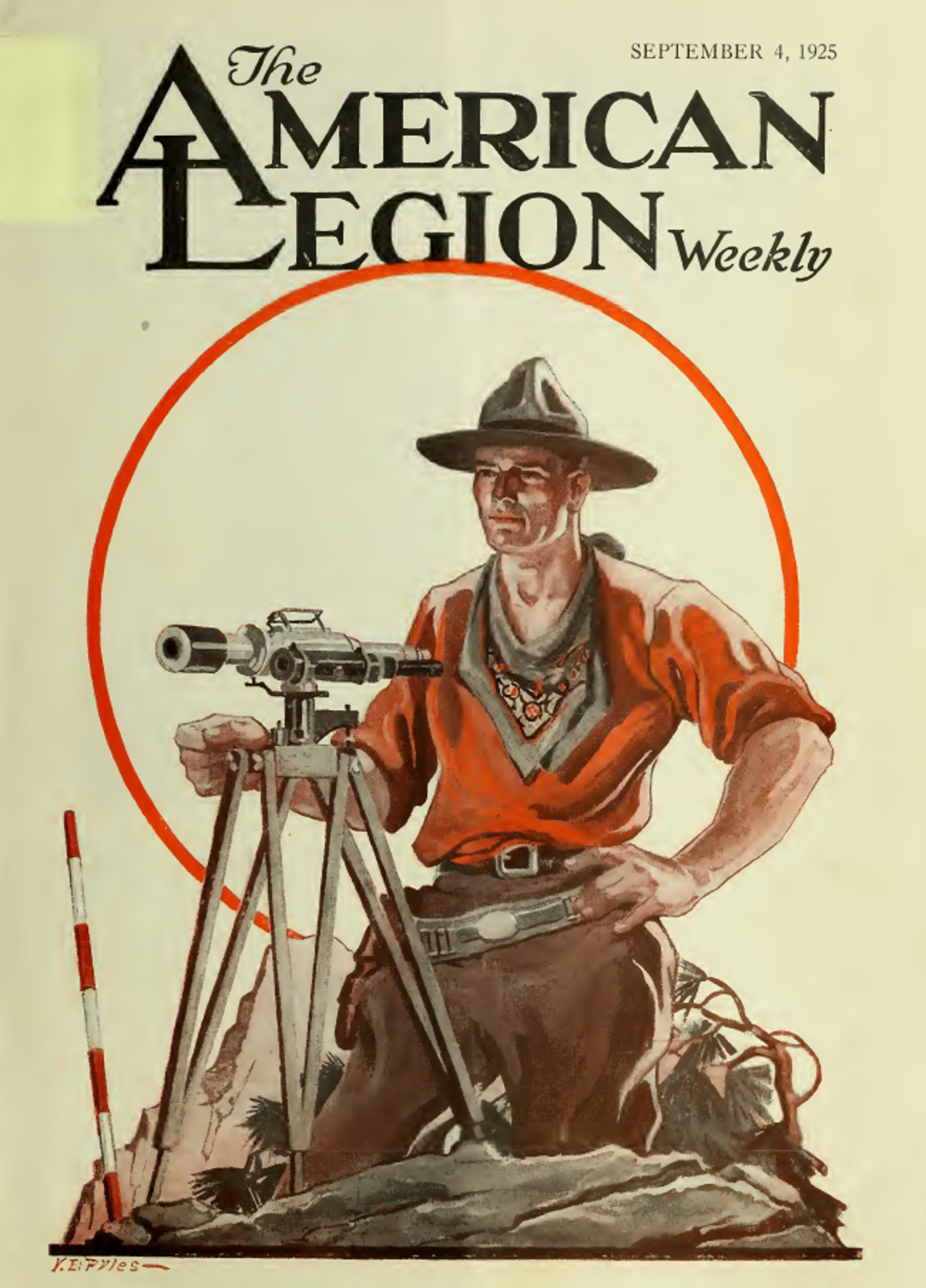
1925 depiction of a Surveyor by V. E. Pyles

Most of the United States recognizes surveying as a distinct profession apart from engineering. Licensing requirements vary by state, but they have components of education, experience, and examinations. Most states insist upon the basic qualification of a degree in surveying, plus experience and examination requirements. In the past, candidates completed an apprenticeship before taking a series of examinations to gain licensure.

The licensing process follows two phases. Upon graduation, the candidate may take the Fundamentals of Surveying (FS) exam. If they pass and meet the other requirements they become a surveying intern (SI). Upon certification as an SI, the candidate then needs to gain on-the-job experience to become eligible for the second phase. In most states, this is the Principles and Practice of Land Surveying (PS) exam and a state-specific examination. SIs were formerly called surveyors in training (SIT), which they are still known by in some states.

Licensed surveyors usually denote themselves with post nominals. The letters PLS (professional land surveyor), PS (professional surveyor), LS (land surveyor), RLS (registered land surveyor), RPLS (Registered Professional Land Surveyor), or PSM (professional surveyor and mapper) follow their names, depending upon their jurisdiction of registration.

Within the United States a majority of states' land law systems are derived from English Common Law, while several states still retain at least some of their land laws from Civil Law, being settled and established originally as Spanish and French territories, such as Louisiana, Texas, Arizona, etc...
