= History of surveying in the United States =

Mapping Indian land cessions

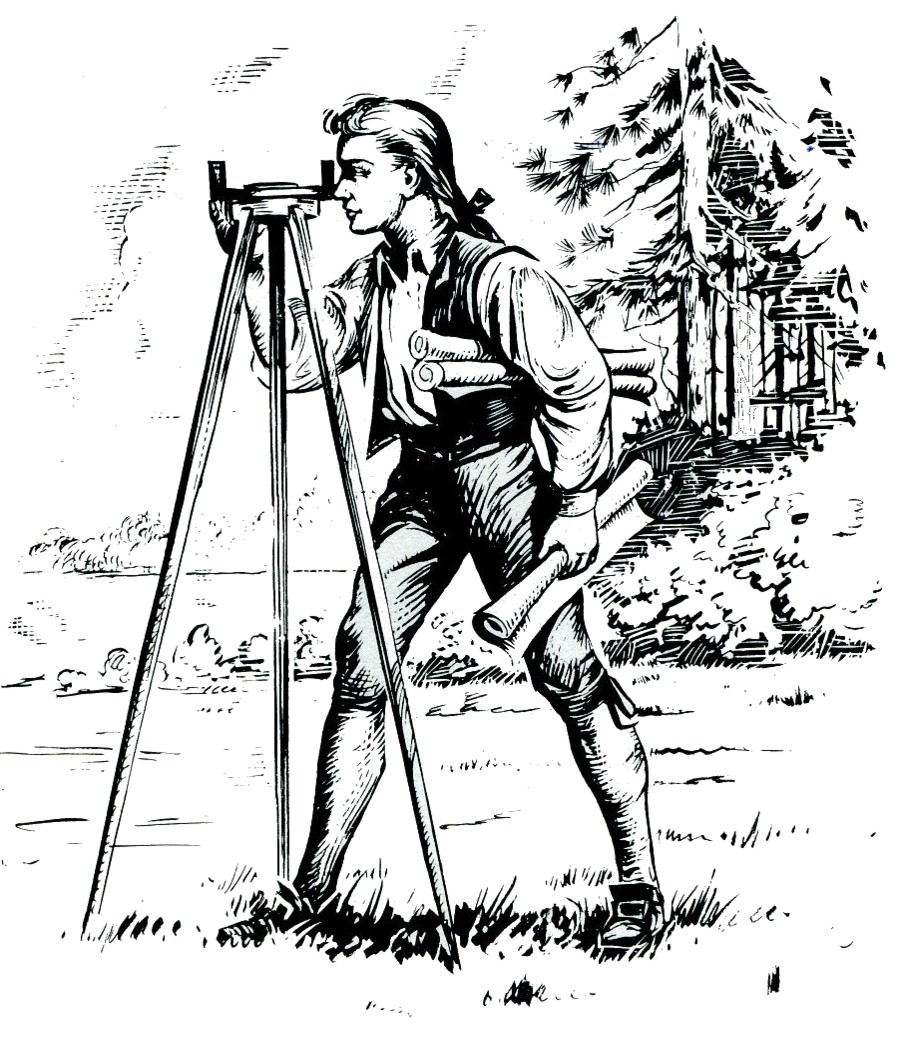
A youthful George Washington surveying at Pope's Creek, Virginia.

The history of surveying in the United States included the mapping of large, unknown territories and the layout of the District of Columbia. Several presidents were involved, including George Washington.

== The Founding Father as a surveyor ==
George Washington was not only a founding political father of the U.S., but he was also a founding surveyor of Virginia, as well. At the age of eleven, he inherited Ferry Farm. When George reached school age, instead of a career in the Royal Navy, George went to school to study surveying and geometry. His first surveying tools were from his own storehouse on Ferry Farm. At the age of 17, under the tutelage of Joshua Fry, he surveyed the northern neck of Virginia and became the county surveyor for Culpeper County, Virginia. By the time of the French and Indian War, he had laid out most of northern Virginia, and this knowledge would contribute to his success during the war.

From 1747 to 1799, he surveyed 200 tracts of land, and due to his also being a land speculator, he amassed 65,000 acres (260 km^{2}) of land.

During the Revolutionary War, he appointed the first geographer of the Continental Army, Robert Erskine.

== Surveying the District of Columbia ==
Surveying was not only for the wealthy plantation owners, but the entire new nation needed to be surveyed and resurveyed. Most of all, the proposed new capital city, bearing Washington's name, needed to be surveyed. A two-man team would survey what became the District of Columbia in 1791. The first was Benjamin Banneker, a free ex-slave, who learned to read, write, and do the math from his grandmother. Banneker would go on to be a leading astronomer, mathematician, clockmaker, and most of all, a surveyor. The second man was Andrew Ellicott. He would go on to do several prominent surveys of the area and assist Lewis and Clark in planning their expedition.

== The training of a naturalist ==
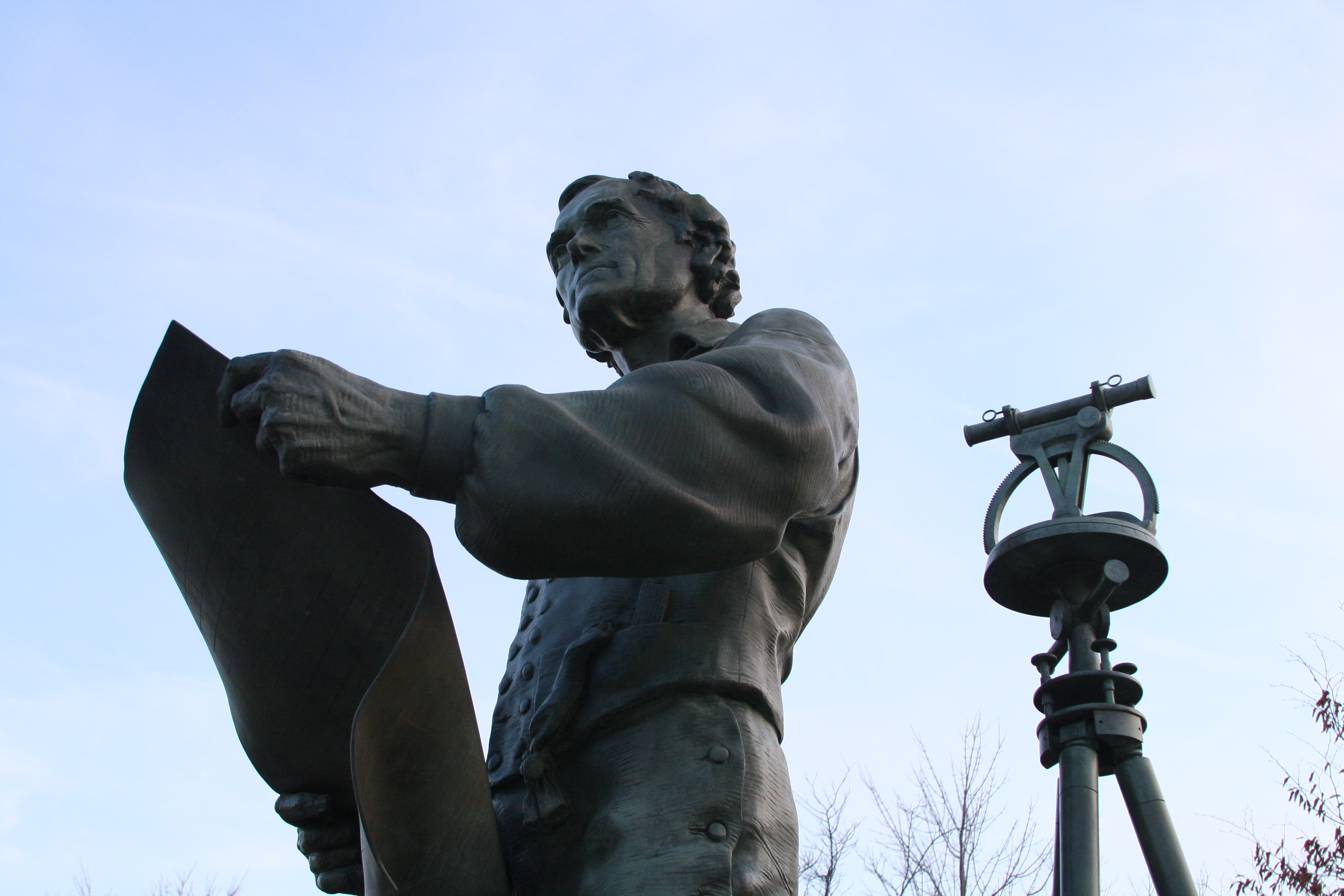
Statue of Jefferson surveying a site for the University of Virginia

Prior to independence, Peter Jefferson, along with his son Thomas Jefferson, were land surveyors for the crown. At this time, surveyors used a system known as the metes and bounds system, which used "monuments"; identifiable objects such as rocks, trees, etc., as property markers. The surveyor would measure from monument to monument. The major problem with this system was that these monuments were not necessarily permanent. As a result, Thomas Jefferson was involved in the creation of the Public Land Survey System. A comparison of county boundaries in the various states graphically displays the difference between the systems, as counties in the Eastern states are irregularly shaped whereas counties in the Midwest tend to be square or rectangular.

Needing money to pay the debts for the Revolutionary War, Jefferson began selling land in the Northwest Territory in plots of 160 acres (650,000 m^{2}) for $2.50 an acre. Soon after, he sold the land in plots of 80 acres (320,000 m^{2}) for $1.25 an acre. The NW Territory was surveyed using the Rectangular System. This system used a central point determined by a principal north–south meridian line and an east–west baseline.

Jefferson convinced Congress to accept the land deal with Napoleon. As a result of the Louisiana Purchase and Jefferson's love for nature, Jefferson organized the Lewis and Clark expedition. Andrew Ellicott taught Lewis and Clark how to use a sextant to map their position. Lewis and Clark would leave from Wood River, Illinois and document the wilderness all the way to the Pacific Ocean.

== Lincoln: politics and surveying ==
Abraham Lincoln came to New Salem in 1831, and shortly after in 1832, he lost in his bid to become a state representative. The Sangamon County surveyor, John Calhoun, then offered Lincoln a job as deputy surveyor due to the high volume of resurveying.

As deputy surveyor, Lincoln surveyed five towns, four roads, and thirty properties. The first was the plat for Huron, a proposed town 30 miles (48 km) North of Springfield that never came to be. The proposal was that county would build a canal to straighten the Sangamon River, but the canal was never built. The last town Lincoln laid out was New Boston, a town at the confluence of the Iowa River and the Mississippi River. Instead of payment for his work, Lincoln had his surveying equipment repossessed and sold. Unknown to Lincoln, Jimmy Short, a friend, bought all of his equipment, his horse, and his saddlebags. Short returned Lincoln's surveying equipment and later, as president, Lincoln returned the favor by making Short the Indian Agent of the Round Lake Indian Reservation.

== Later history ==
Over the course of the 19th century, land surveying in America transformed from a prestigious, status-driven endeavor derived from the authority of a royal government and administration that had been inherited from the colonial era, to the more practical, and standardized modern field of public service as it is generally recognized today, which would lead the way in the vast expansion straight across the Continent to the West Coast. The Public Land Survey System was mainly involved in overseeing the surveying of these vast new swaths of private lands along the ever-shifting frontier, while Federal Organizations such as the United States Coast and Geodetic Survey and the United States General Land Office, among several others, dealt with surveying all the lands deemed federal property in these new territories, as well as the already established post-colonial jurisdictions.

This would finally shift to the individual states' maintaining and administering the surveying of all land within their respective jurisdictions, as these new territories continually were being admitted as new states to the Union, becoming the system of land surveying that we have in the United States right down to the present day.

- Category:Historic surveying landmarks in the United States

== See also ==
- Public Land Survey System
