= Pseudorange =

Pseudo distance between a satellite and a navigation satellite receiver

The pseudorange is the pseudo distance between a satellite and a navigation satellite receiver (see GNSS positioning calculation), for instance Global Positioning System (GPS) receivers.

To determine its position, a satellite navigation receiver will determine the ranges to (at least) four satellites as well as their positions at time of transmitting. Knowing the satellites' orbital parameters, these positions can be calculated for any point in time. The pseudoranges of each satellite are obtained by multiplying the speed of light by the time the signal has taken from the satellite to the receiver. As there are accuracy errors in the time measured, the term pseudo-ranges is used rather than ranges for such distances.

== Pseudorange and time error estimation ==
Typically a quartz oscillator is used in the receiver to do the timing. The accuracy of quartz clocks in general is worse (i.e. more) than one part in a million; thus, if the clock hasn't been corrected for a week, the deviation may be so great as to result in a reported location not on the Earth, but outside the Moon's orbit. Even if the clock is corrected, a second later the clock may no longer be usable for positional calculation, because after a second the error will be hundreds of meters for a typical quartz clock. But in a GPS receiver the clock's time is used to measure the ranges to different satellites at almost the same time, meaning all the measured ranges have the same error. Ranges with the same error are called pseudoranges. By finding the pseudo-range of an additional fourth satellite for precise position calculation, the time error can also be estimated. Therefore, by having the pseudoranges and the locations of four satellites, the actual receiver's position along the x, y, z axes and the time error $\Delta t$ can be computed accurately.

The reason we speak of pseudo-ranges rather than ranges, is precisely this "contamination" with unknown receiver clock offset. GPS positioning is sometimes referred to as trilateration, but would be more accurately referred to as pseudo-trilateration.

Following the laws of error propagation, neither the receiver position nor the clock offset are computed exactly, but rather estimated through a least squares adjustment procedure known from geodesy. To describe this imprecision, so-called GDOP quantities have been defined: geometric dilution of precision (x,y,z,t).

Pseudorange calculations therefore use the signals of four satellites to compute the receiver's location and the clock error. A clock with an accuracy of one in a million will introduce an error of one millionth of a second each second. This error multiplied by the speed of light gives an error of 300 meters. For a typical satellite constellation this error will increase by about $\textstyle{\sqrt 2}$ (less if satellites are close together, more if satellites are all near the horizon). If positional calculation was done using this clock and only using three satellites, just standing still the GPS would indicate that you are traveling at a speed in excess of 300 meters per second, (over 1000 km/hour or 600 miles an hour). With only signals from three satellites the GPS receiver would not be able to determine whether the 300m/s was due to clock error or actual movement of the GPS receiver.

If the satellites being used are scattered throughout the sky, then the value of geometric dilution of precision (GDOP) is low while if satellites are clustered near each other from the receiver's vantage point the GDOP values are higher. The lower the value of GDOP then the better the ratio of position error to range error computing will be, so GDOP plays an important role in calculating the receiver's position on the surface of the earth using pseudoranges. The larger the number of satellites, the better the value of GDOP will be.

== See also ==
- Pseudo-range multilateration
