= Surveying =

Science of determining the positions of points and the distances and angles between them

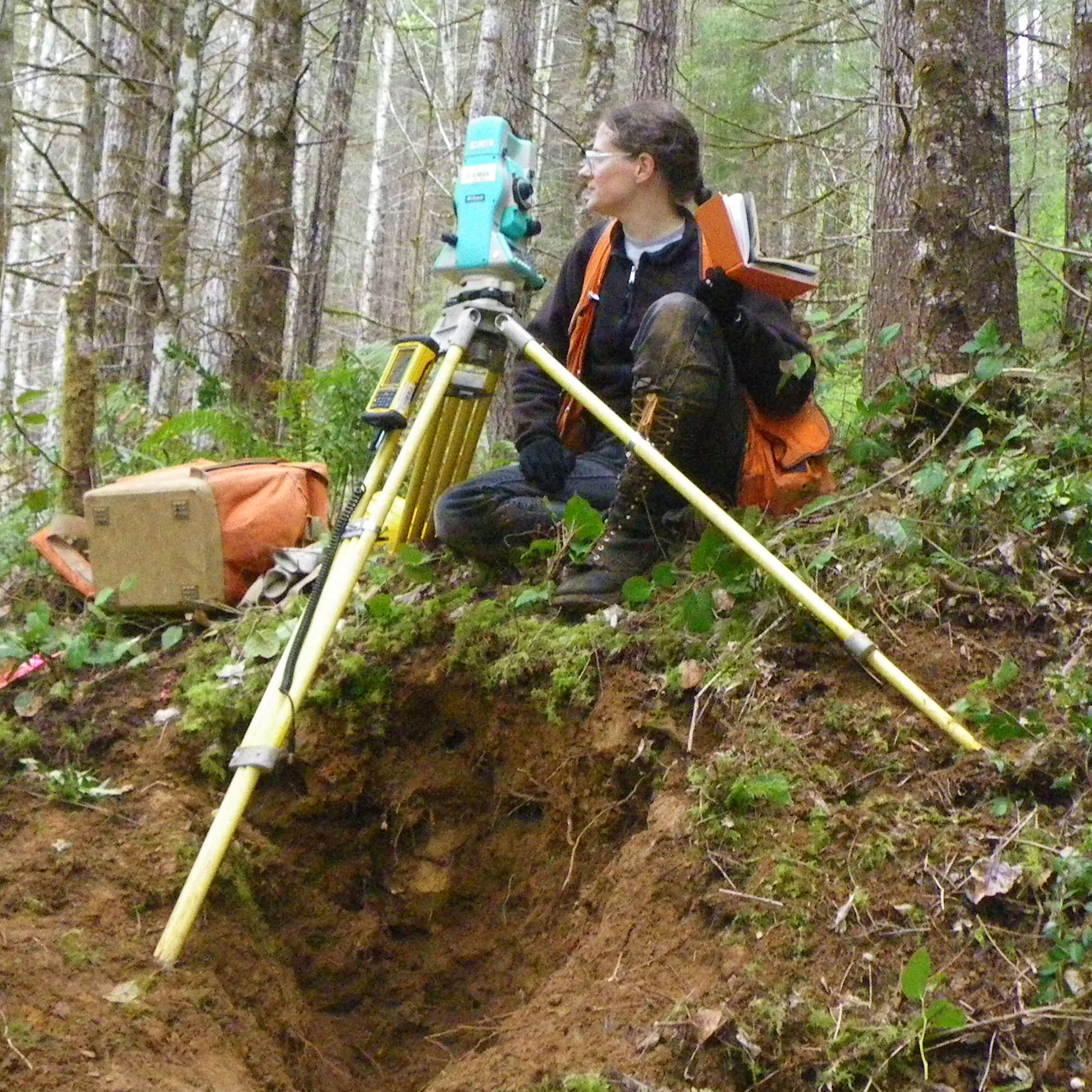
A surveyor using a total station

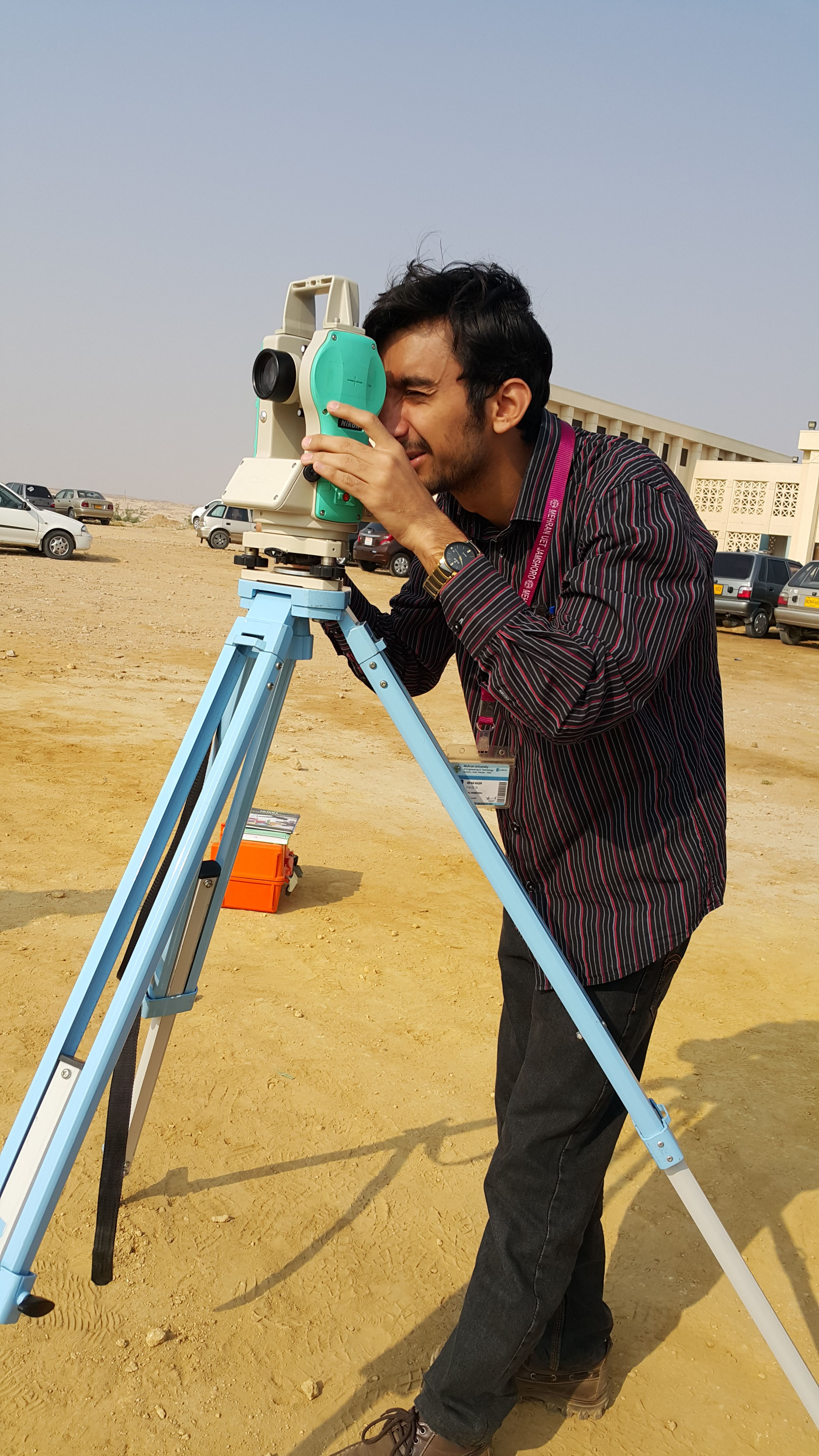
A student using a theodolite in field

Surveying or land surveying is the technique, profession, art, and science of determining the terrestrial positions of points based on the distances and angles between them. These points are usually on the surface of the Earth, and they are often used to establish maps and boundaries for purposes of ownership, such as the designated positions of structural components for construction or the surface location of subsurface features, or for other purposes required by government or civil law, such as property sales.

A professional in land surveying is called a land surveyor. Surveyors work with elements of geodesy, geometry, trigonometry, regression analysis, physics, engineering, metrology, programming languages, and the law. They use equipment, such as total stations, robotic total stations, theodolites, GNSS receivers, retroreflectors, 3D scanners, lidar sensors, radios, inclinometer, handheld tablets, optical and digital levels, subsurface locators, drones, GIS, and surveying software.

Surveying has been an element in the development of the human environment since the beginning of recorded history. It is used in the planning and execution of most forms of construction. It is also used in transportation, communications, mapping, and the definition of legal boundaries for land ownership. It is an important tool for research in many other scientific disciplines.

== Definition ==
The International Federation of Surveyors defines the function of surveying as follows:

A surveyor is a professional person with the academic qualifications and technical expertise to conduct one, or more, of the following activities;

- to determine, measure and represent land, three-dimensional objects, point-fields and trajectories;
- to assemble and interpret land and geographically related information,
- to use that information for the planning and efficient administration of the land, the sea and any structures thereon; and,
- to conduct research into the above practices and to develop them.

== History ==
=== Ancient history ===
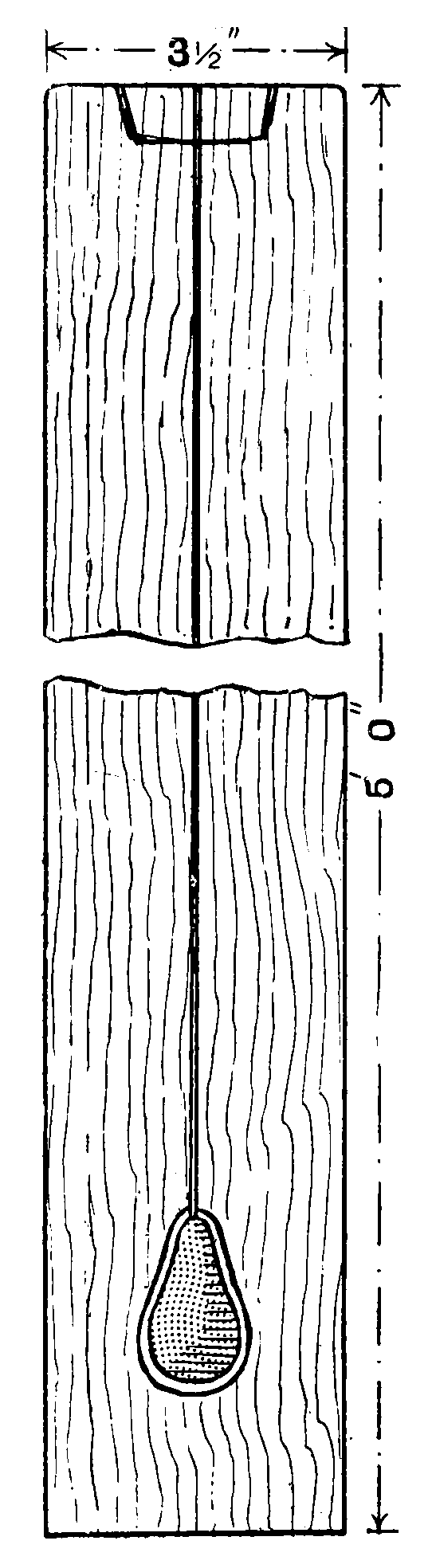
A plumb rule from the book Cassells' Carpentry and Joinery

Surveying has occurred since humans built the first large structures. In ancient Egypt, a rope stretcher would use simple geometry to re-establish boundaries after the annual floods of the Nile River. The almost perfect squareness and north–south orientation of the Great Pyramid of Giza, built c. 2700 BC, affirm the Egyptians' command of surveying. The groma instrument may have originated in Mesopotamia (early 1st millennium BC). The prehistoric monument at Stonehenge (c. 2500 BC) was set out by prehistoric surveyors using peg and rope geometry.

The mathematician Liu Hui described ways of measuring distant objects in his work Haidao Suanjing or The Sea Island Mathematical Manual, published in 263 AD.

The Romans recognized land surveying as a profession. They established the basic measurements under which the Roman Empire was divided, such as a tax register of conquered lands (300 AD). Roman surveyors were known as Gromatici.

In medieval Europe, beating the bounds maintained the boundaries of a village or parish. This was the practice of gathering a group of residents and walking around the parish or village to establish a communal memory of the boundaries. Young boys were included to ensure the memory lasted as long as possible.

In England, William the Conqueror commissioned the Domesday Book in 1086. It recorded the names of all the landowners, the area of land they owned, the quality of the land, and specific information about the area's content and inhabitants. It did not include maps showing exact locations.

=== Modern era ===
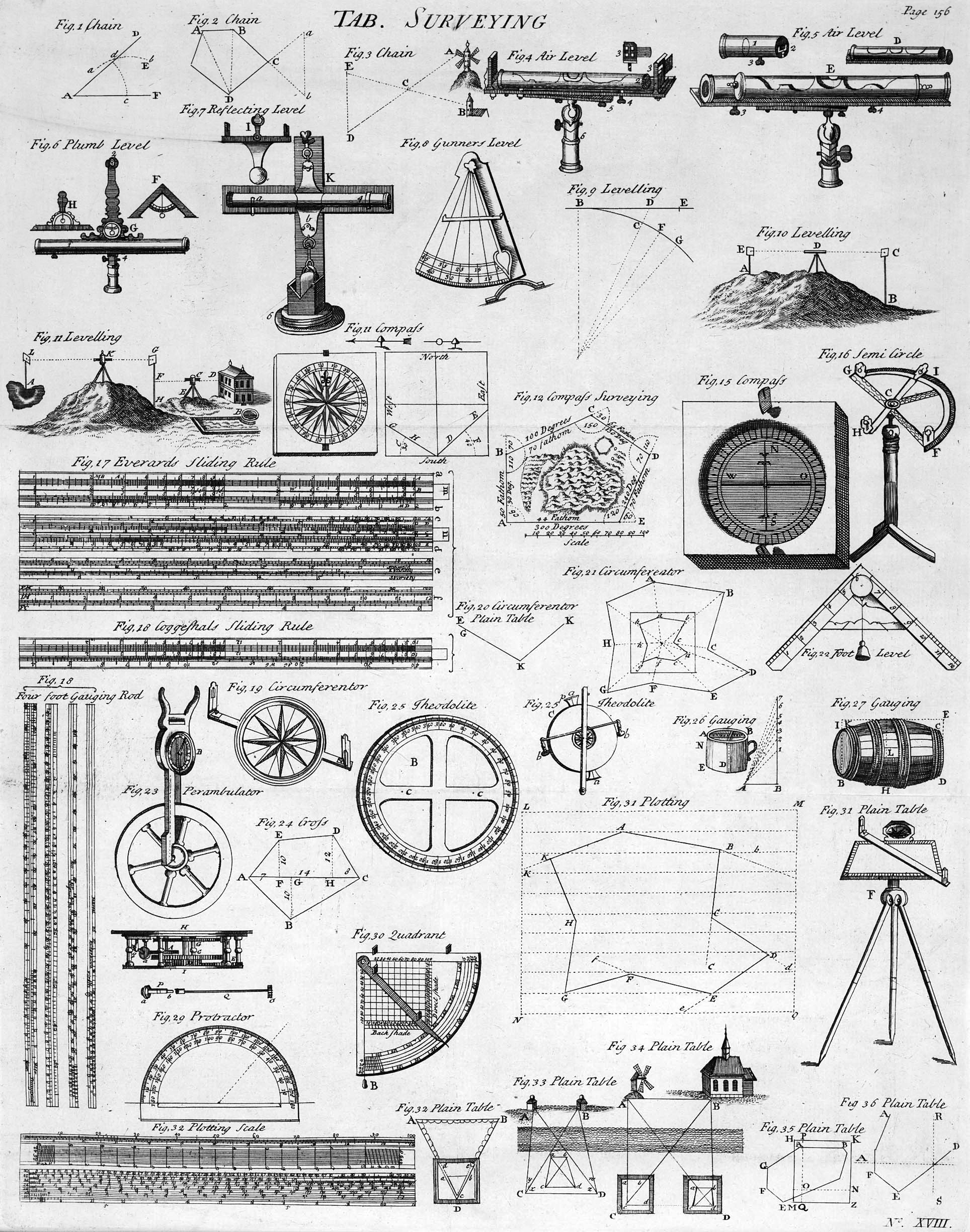
Table of Surveying, 1728 Cyclopaedia

Abel Foullon described a plane table in 1551, but it is thought that the instrument was in use earlier as his description is of a developed instrument.

Gunter's chain was introduced in 1620 by English mathematician Edmund Gunter. It enabled plots of land to be accurately surveyed and plotted for legal and commercial purposes.

Leonard Digges described a theodolite that measured horizontal angles in his book A geometric practice named Pantometria (1571). Joshua Habermel (Erasmus Habermehl) created a theodolite with a compass and tripod in 1576. Johnathon Sission was the first to incorporate a telescope on a theodolite in 1725.

In the 18th century, modern techniques and instruments for surveying began to be used. Jesse Ramsden introduced the first precision theodolite in 1787. It was an instrument for measuring angles in the horizontal and vertical planes. He created his great theodolite using an accurate dividing engine of his own design. Ramsden's theodolite represented a great step forward in the instrument's accuracy. William Gascoigne invented an instrument that used a telescope with an installed crosshair as a target device, in 1640. James Watt developed an optical meter for the measuring of distance in 1771; it measured the parallactic angle from which the distance to a point could be deduced.

Dutch mathematician Willebrord Snellius (a.k.a. Snel van Royen) introduced the modern systematic use of triangulation. In 1615 he surveyed the distance from Alkmaar to Breda, approximately 72 miles (116 km). He underestimated this distance by 3.5%. The survey was a chain of quadrangles containing 33 triangles in all. Snell showed how planar formulae could be corrected to allow for the curvature of the Earth. He also showed how to resect, or calculate, the position of a point inside a triangle using the angles cast between the vertices at the unknown point. These could be measured more accurately than bearings of the vertices, which depended on a compass. His work established the idea of surveying a primary network of control points, and locating subsidiary points inside the primary network later. Between 1733 and 1740, Jacques Cassini and his son César undertook the first triangulation of France. They included a re-surveying of the meridian arc, leading to the publication in 1745 of the first map of France constructed on rigorous principles. By this time triangulation methods were well established for local map-making.

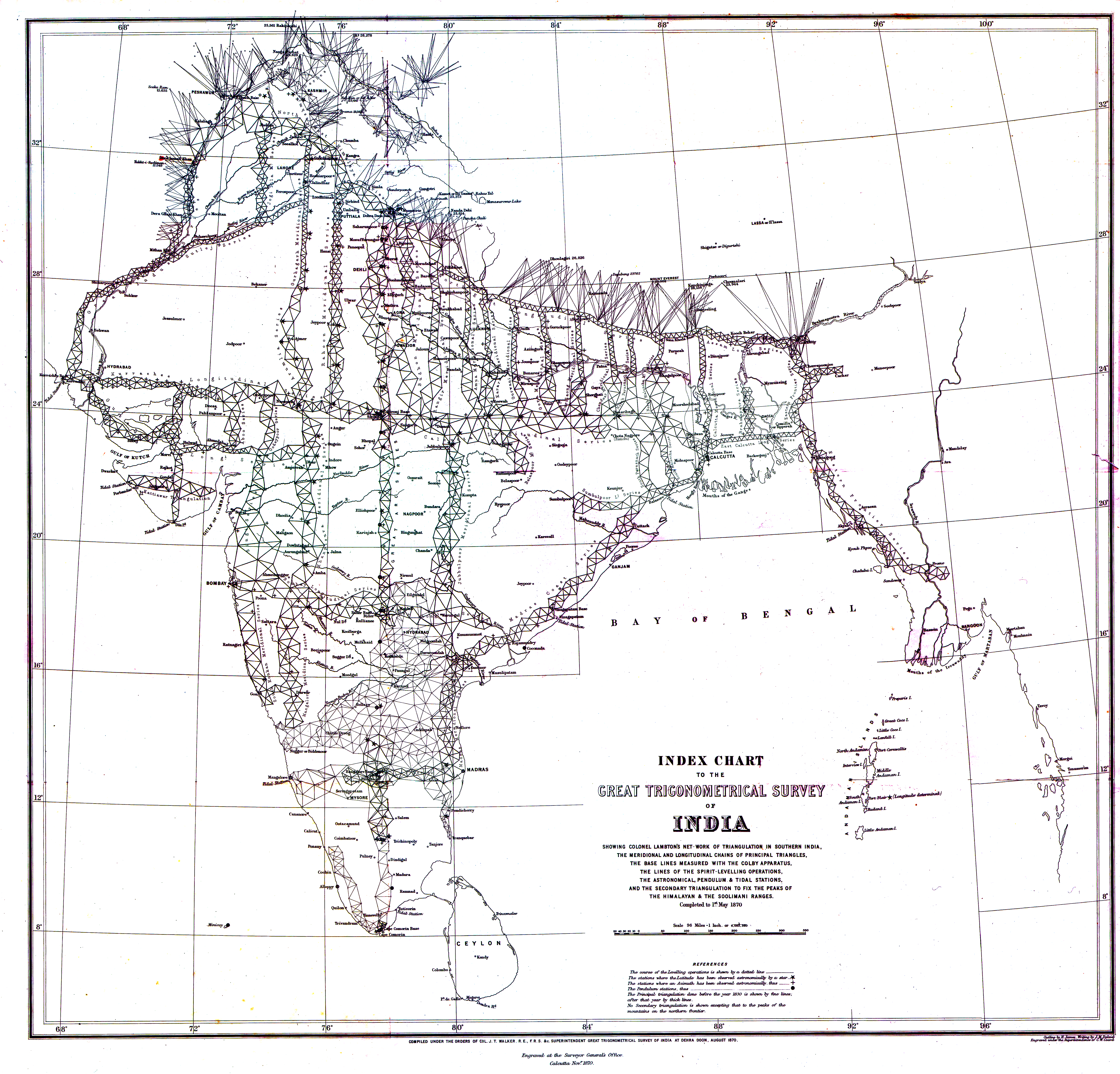
A map of India showing the Great Trigonometrical Survey, produced in 1870

It was only towards the end of the 18th century that detailed triangulation network surveys mapped whole countries. In 1784, a team from General William Roy's Ordnance Survey of Great Britain began the Principal Triangulation of Britain. The first Ramsden theodolite was built for this survey. The survey was finally completed in 1853. The Great Trigonometric Survey of India began in 1801. The Indian survey had an enormous scientific impact. It was responsible for one of the first accurate measurements of a section of an arc of longitude, and for measurements of the geodesic anomaly. It named and mapped Mount Everest and the other Himalayan peaks. Surveying became a professional occupation in high demand at the turn of the 19th century with the onset of the Industrial Revolution. The profession developed more accurate instruments to aid its work. Industrial infrastructure projects used surveyors to lay out canals, roads and rail.

In the US, the Land Ordinance of 1785 created the Public Land Survey System. It formed the basis for dividing the western territories into sections to allow the sale of land. The PLSS divided states into township grids which were further divided into sections and fractions of sections.

Napoleon Bonaparte founded continental Europe's first cadastre in 1808. This gathered data on the number of parcels of land, their value, land usage, and names. This system soon spread around Europe.

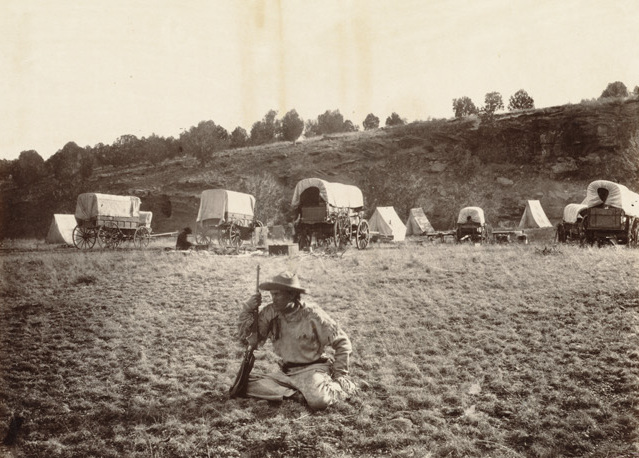
A railroad surveying party at Russel's Tank, Arizona, in the 1860s

Robert Torrens introduced the Torrens system in South Australia in 1858. Torrens intended to simplify land transactions and provide reliable titles via a centralized register of land. The Torrens system was adopted in several other nations of the English-speaking world. Surveying became increasingly important with the arrival of railroads in the 1800s. Surveying was necessary so that railroads could plan technologically and financially viable routes.

=== 20th century ===
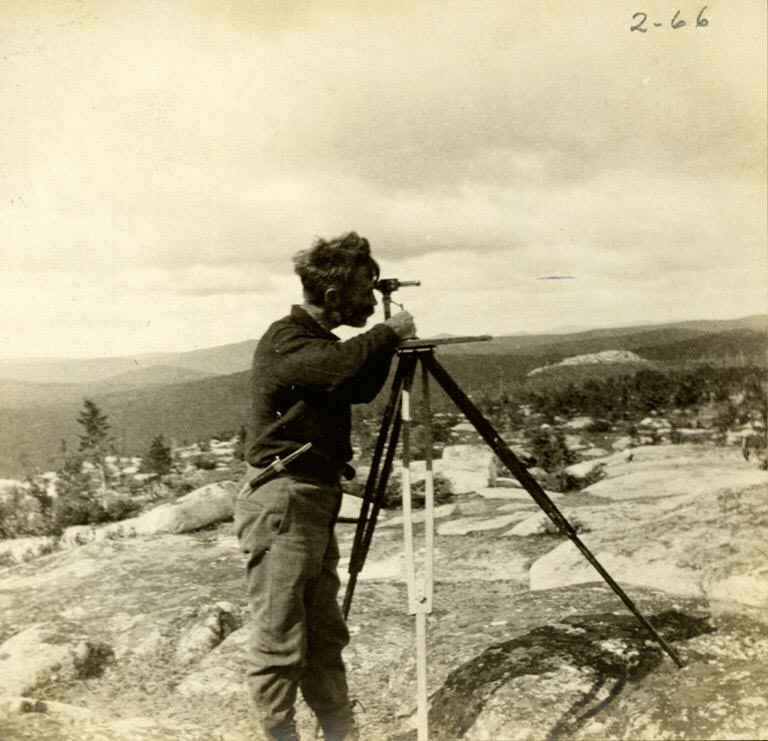
The Canadian cartographer William Francis Ganong surveying in 1903

At the beginning of the century, surveyors had improved the older chains and ropes, but they still faced the problem of accurate measurement of long distances. Trevor Lloyd Wadley developed the Tellurometer during the 1950s. It measures long distances using two microwave transmitter/receivers. During the late 1950s Geodimeter introduced electronic distance measurement (EDM) equipment. EDM units use a multi frequency phase shift of light waves to find a distance. These instruments eliminated the need for days or weeks of chain measurement by measuring between points kilometers apart in one go.

Advances in electronics allowed miniaturization of EDM. In the 1970s the first instruments combining angle and distance measurement appeared, becoming known as total stations. Manufacturers added more equipment by degrees, bringing improvements in accuracy and speed of measurement. Major advances include tilt compensators, data recorders and on-board calculation programs.

The first satellite positioning system was the US Navy TRANSIT system. The first successful launch took place in 1960. The system's main purpose was to provide position information to Polaris missile submarines. Surveyors found they could use field receivers to determine the location of a point. Sparse satellite coverage and large equipment made observations laborious and inaccurate. The main use was establishing benchmarks in remote locations.

The US Air Force launched the first prototype satellites of the Global Positioning System (GPS) in 1978. GPS used a larger constellation of satellites and improved signal transmission, thus improving accuracy. Early GPS observations required several hours of observations by a static receiver to reach survey accuracy requirements. Later improvements to both satellites and receivers allowed for Real Time Kinematic (RTK) surveying. RTK surveys provide high-accuracy measurements by using a fixed base station and a second roving antenna. The position of the roving antenna can be tracked.

=== 21st century ===
The theodolite, total station and RTK GPS survey remain the primary methods in use.

Remote sensing and satellite imagery continue to improve and become cheaper, allowing more commonplace use. Prominent new technologies include three-dimensional (3D) scanning and lidar-based topographical surveys. UAV technology along with photogrammetric image processing is also appearing.

== Equipment ==
=== Hardware ===
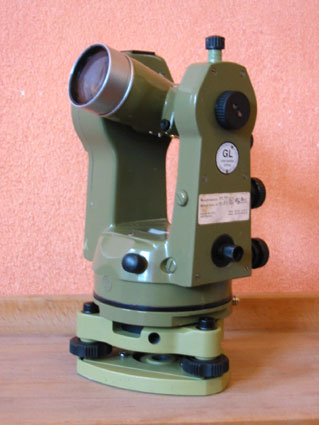
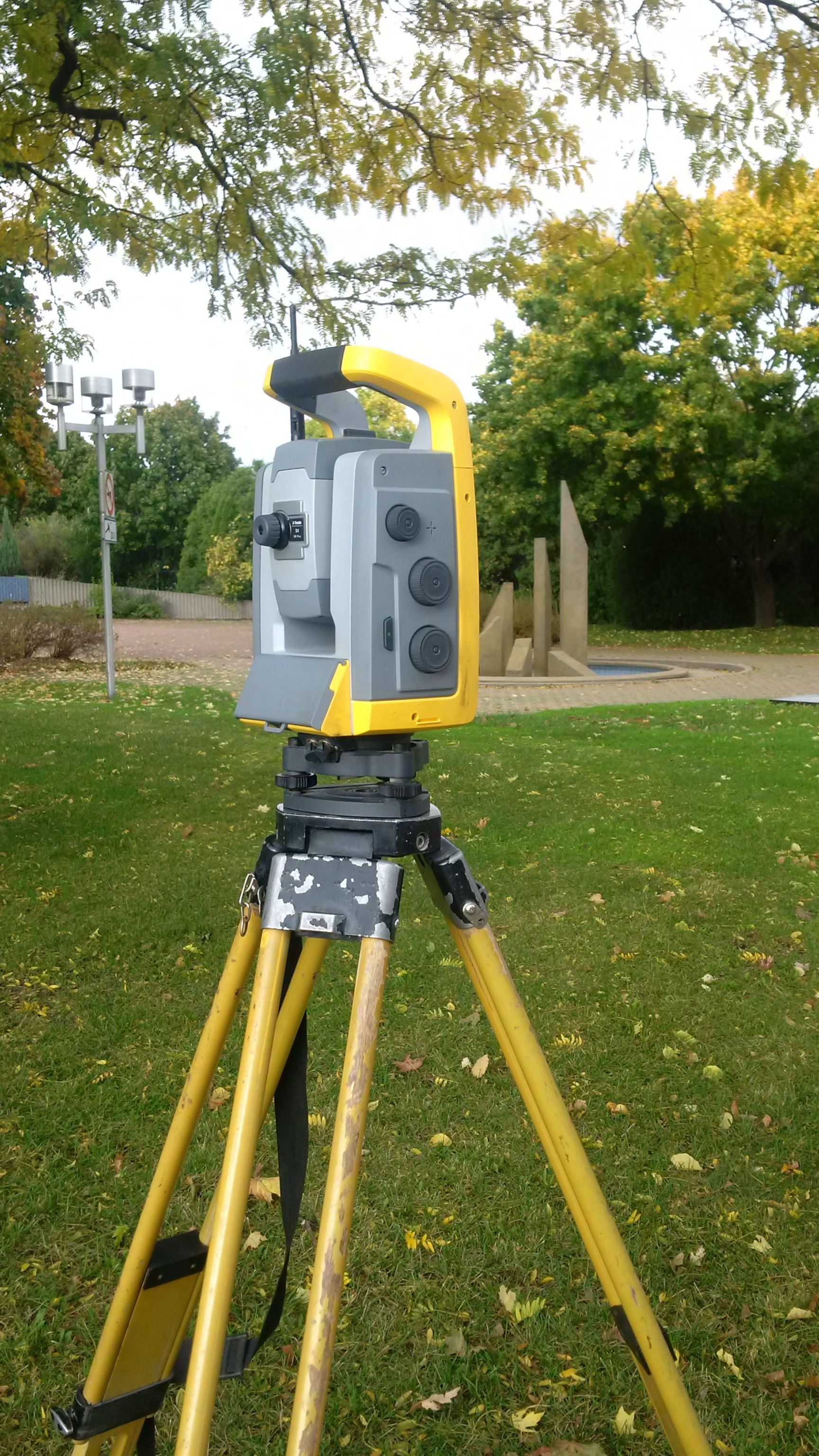
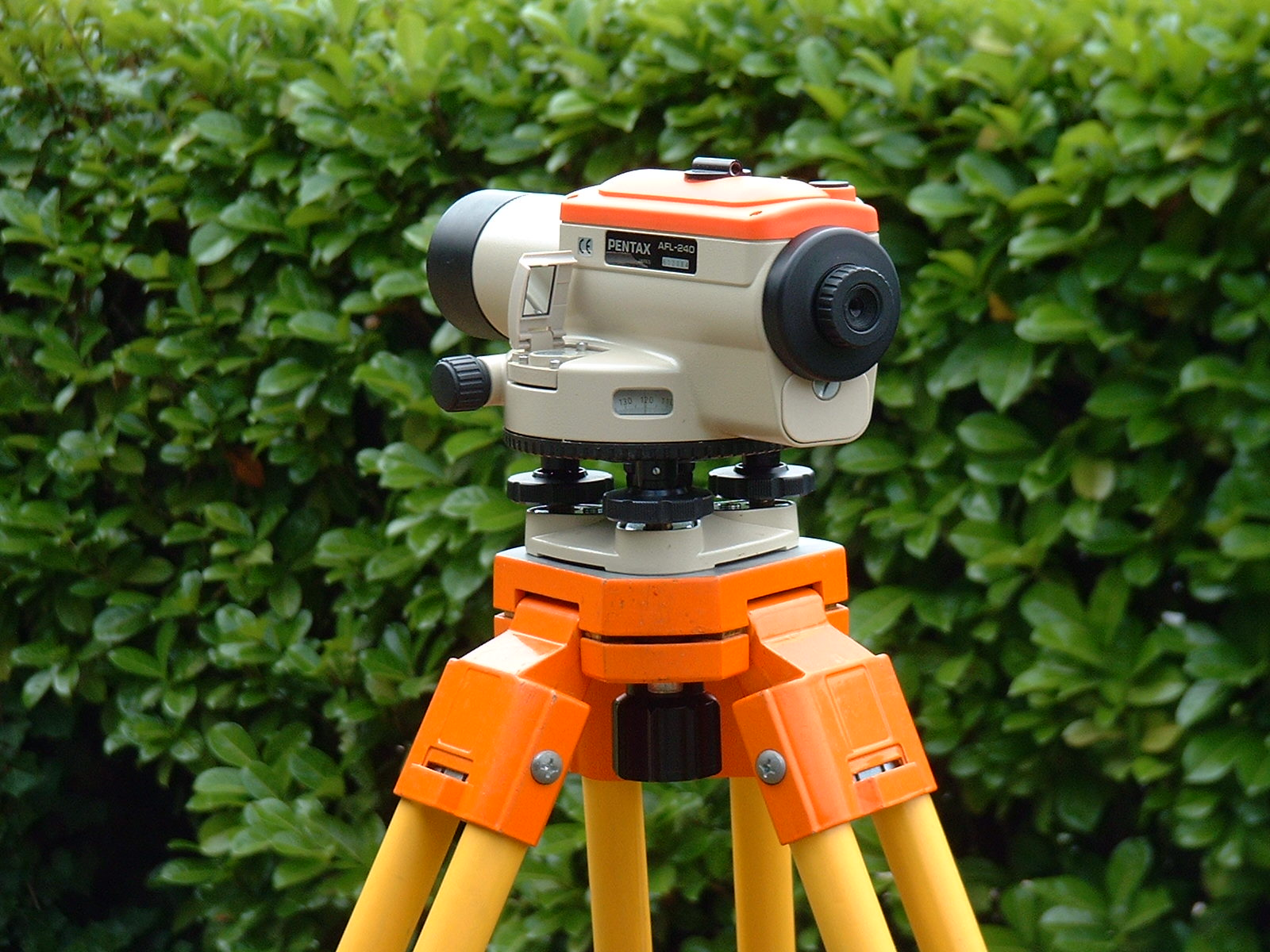
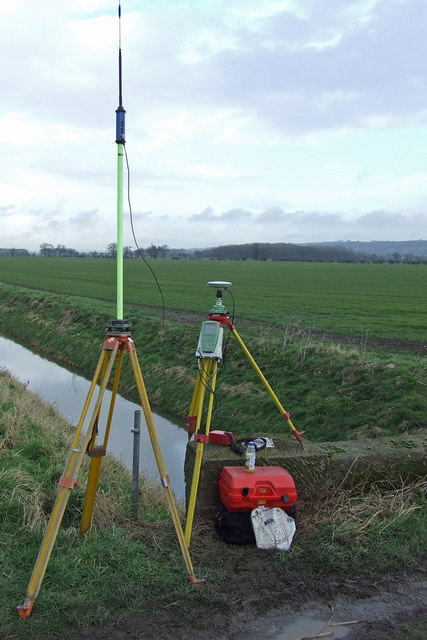
Surveying equipment. Clockwise from upper left: optical theodolite, robotic total station, RTK GPS base station, optical level.

The main surveying instruments in use around the world are the theodolite, measuring tape, total station, 3D scanners, GPS/GNSS, level and rod. Most instruments screw onto a tripod when in use. Tape measures are often used for measurement of smaller distances. 3D scanners and various forms of aerial imagery are also used.

The theodolite is an instrument for the measurement of angles. It uses two separate circles, protractors or alidades to measure angles in the horizontal and the vertical plane. A telescope mounted on trunnions is aligned vertically with the target object. The whole upper section rotates for horizontal alignment. The vertical circle measures the angle that the telescope makes against the vertical, known as the zenith angle. The horizontal circle uses an upper and lower plate. When beginning the survey, the surveyor points the instrument in a known direction (bearing), and clamps the lower plate in place. The instrument can then rotate to measure the bearing to other objects. If no bearing is known or direct angle measurement is wanted, the instrument can be set to zero during the initial sight. It will then read the angle between the initial object, the theodolite itself, and the item that the telescope aligns with.

The gyrotheodolite is a form of theodolite that uses a gyroscope to orient itself in the absence of reference marks. It is used in underground applications.

The total station is a development of the theodolite with an electronic distance measurement device (EDM). A total station can be used for leveling when set to the horizontal plane. Since their introduction, total stations have shifted from optical-mechanical to fully electronic devices.

Modern top-of-the-line total stations no longer need a reflector or prism to return the light pulses used for distance measurements. They are fully robotic, and can even e-mail point data to a remote computer and connect to satellite positioning systems, such as Global Positioning System. Real Time Kinematic GPS systems have significantly increased the speed of surveying, and they are now horizontally accurate to within 1 cm ± 1 ppm in real-time, while vertically it is currently about half of that to within 2 cm ± 2 ppm.

GPS surveying differs from other GPS uses in the equipment and methods used. Static GPS uses two receivers placed in position for a considerable length of time. The long span of time lets the receiver compare measurements as the satellites orbit. The changes as the satellites orbit also provide the measurement network with well-conditioned geometry. This produces an accurate baseline that can be over 20 km long. RTK surveying uses one static antenna and one roving antenna. The static antenna tracks changes in the satellite positions and atmospheric conditions. The surveyor uses the roving antenna to measure the points needed for the survey. The two antennas use a radio link that allows the static antenna to send corrections to the roving antenna. The roving antenna then applies those corrections to the GPS signals it is receiving to calculate its own position. RTK surveying covers smaller distances than static methods. This is because divergent conditions further away from the base reduce accuracy.

Surveying instruments have characteristics that make them suitable for certain uses. Theodolites and levels are often used by constructors rather than surveyors in first-world countries. The constructor can perform simple survey tasks using a relatively cheap instrument. Total stations are workhorses for many professional surveyors because they are versatile and reliable in all conditions. The productivity improvements from a GPS on large-scale surveys make them popular for major infrastructure or data-gathering projects. One-person robotic-guided total stations allow surveyors to measure without extra workers to aim the telescope or record data. A fast but expensive way to measure large areas is with a helicopter, using a GPS to record the location of the helicopter and a laser scanner to measure the ground. To increase precision, surveyors place beacons on the ground (about 20 km (12 mi) apart). This method reaches precisions between 5–40 cm (depending on flight height).

Surveyors use ancillary equipment such as tripods and instrument stands; staves and beacons used for sighting purposes; PPE; vegetation clearing equipment; digging implements for finding survey markers buried over time; hammers for placements of markers in various surfaces and structures; and portable radios for communication over long lines of sight.

=== Software ===
Land surveyors, construction professionals, geomatics engineers and civil engineers using total station, GPS, 3D scanners, and other data collectors use land surveying software to increase efficiency, accuracy, and productivity. Land Surveying Software is a staple of contemporary land surveying.

Typically, much if not all of the drafting and some of the designing for plans and plats of the surveyed property is done by the surveyor, and nearly everyone working in the area of drafting today (2021) utilizes CAD software and hardware both on PC, and more and more in newer generation data collectors in the field as well. Other computer platforms and tools commonly used today by surveyors are offered online by the U.S. Federal Government and other governments' survey agencies, such as the National Geodetic Survey and the CORS network, to get automated corrections and conversions for collected GPS data, and the data coordinate systems themselves.

== Techniques ==
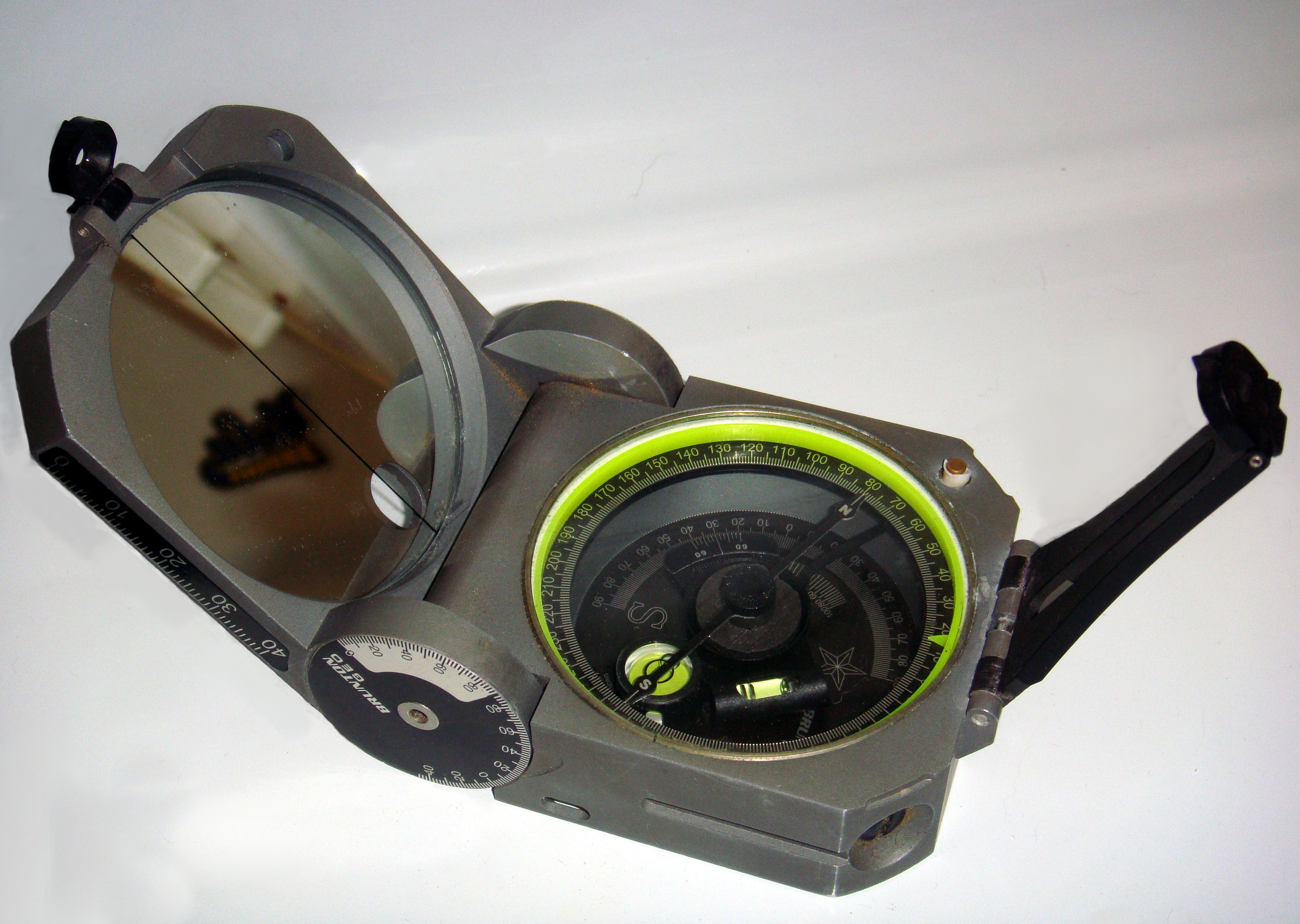
A standard Brunton Geo compass, still used commonly today by geographers, geologists, and surveyors for field-based measurements

Surveyors determine the position of objects by measuring angles and distances. The factors that can affect the accuracy of their observations are also measured. They then use this data to create vectors, bearings, coordinates, elevations, areas, volumes, plans and maps. Measurements are often split into horizontal and vertical components to simplify calculation. GPS and astronomical measurements also need measurement of a time component.

=== Distance measurement ===
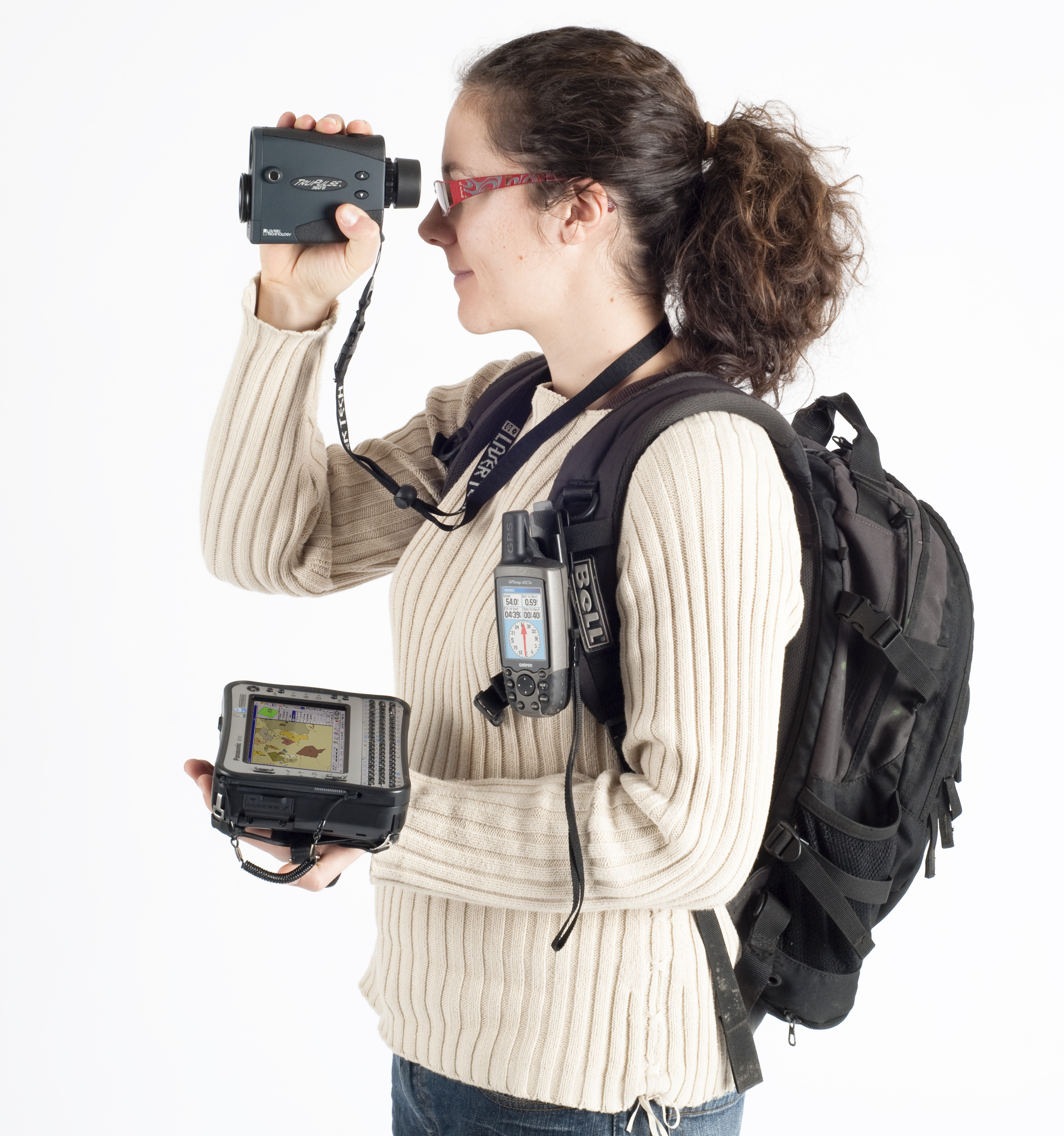
Example of modern equipment for surveying (Field-Map technology): GPS, laser rangefinder and field computer allows surveying as well as cartography (creation of map in real-time) and field data collection.

Before EDM (Electronic Distance Measurement) laser devices, distances were measured using a variety of means. In pre-colonial America Natives would use the "bow shot" as a distance reference ("as far as an arrow can slung out of a bow", or "flights of a Cherokee long bow"). Europeans used chains with links of a known length such as a Gunter's chain, or measuring tapes made of steel or invar. To measure horizontal distances, these chains or tapes were pulled taut to reduce sagging and slack. The distance had to be adjusted for heat expansion. Attempts to hold the measuring instrument level would also be made. When measuring up a slope, the surveyor might have to "break" (break chain) the measurement- use an increment less than the total length of the chain. Perambulators, or measuring wheels, were used to measure longer distances but not to a high level of accuracy. Tacheometry is the science of measuring distances by measuring the angle between two ends of an object with a known size. It was sometimes used before the invention of EDM where rough ground made chain measurement impractical.

=== Angle measurement ===
Historically, horizontal angles were measured by using a compass to provide a magnetic bearing or azimuth. Later, more precise scribed discs improved angular resolution. Mounting telescopes with reticles atop the disc allowed more precise sighting (see theodolite). Levels and calibrated circles allowed the measurement of vertical angles. Verniers allowed measurement to a fraction of a degree, such as with a turn-of-the-century transit.

The plane table provided a graphical method of recording and measuring angles, which reduced the amount of mathematics required. In 1829 Francis Ronalds invented a reflecting instrument for recording angles graphically by modifying the octant.

By observing the bearing from every vertex in a figure, a surveyor can measure around the figure. The final observation will be between the two points first observed, except with a 180° difference. This is called a close. If the first and last bearings are different, this shows the error in the survey, called the angular misclose. The surveyor can use this information to prove that the work meets the expected standards.

=== Leveling ===
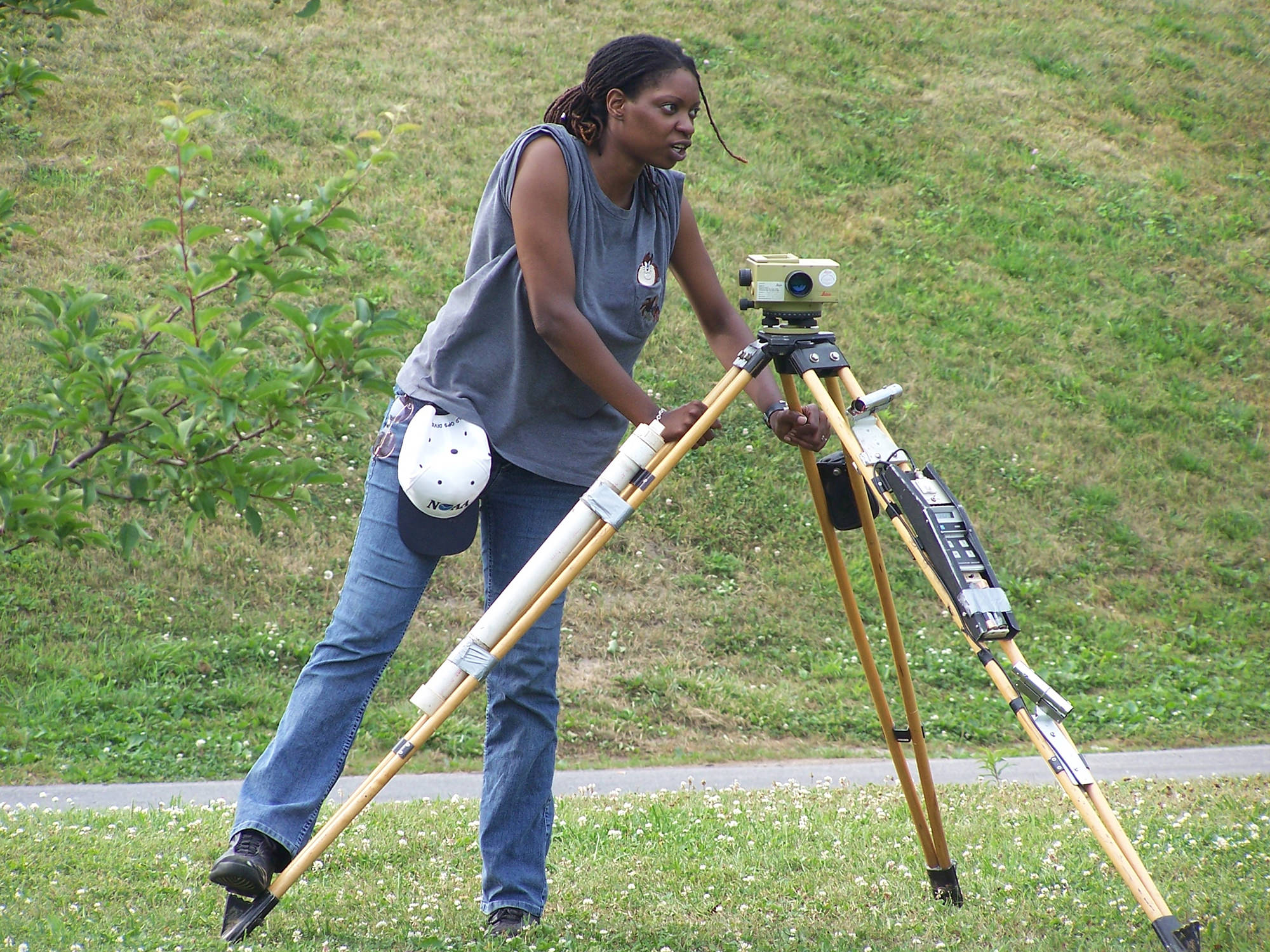
A Center for Operational Oceanographic Products and Services staff member conducts tide station leveling in support of the US Army Corps of Engineers in Richmond, Maine.

The simplest method for measuring height is with an altimeter using air pressure to find the height. When more precise measurements are needed, means like precise levels (also known as differential leveling) are used. When precise leveling, a series of measurements between two points are taken using an instrument and a measuring rod. Differences in height between the measurements are added and subtracted in a series to get the net difference in elevation between the two endpoints. With the Global Positioning System (GPS), elevation can be measured with satellite receivers. Usually, GPS is somewhat less accurate than traditional precise leveling, but may be similar over long distances.

When using an optical level, the endpoint may be out of the effective range of the instrument. There may be obstructions or large changes of elevation between the endpoints. In these situations, extra setups are needed. Turning is a term used when referring to moving the level to take an elevation shot from a different location. To "turn" the level, one must first take a reading and record the elevation of the point the rod is located on. While the rod is kept in exactly the same location, the level is moved to a new location where the rod is still visible. A reading is taken from the new location of the level and the height difference is used to find the new elevation of the level gun, which is why this method is referred to as differential levelling. This is repeated until the series of measurements is completed. The level must be horizontal to get a valid measurement. Because of this, if the horizontal crosshair of the instrument is lower than the base of the rod, the surveyor will not be able to sight the rod and get a reading. The rod can usually be raised to 25 feet (7.6 m) high, allowing the level to be set much higher than the base of the rod.

=== Determining position ===
The primary way of determining one's position on the Earth's surface when no known positions are nearby is by astronomical observations. Observations of the Sun, Moon and stars could all be made using navigational techniques. Once the instrument's position and bearing to a star is determined, the bearing can be transferred to a reference point on Earth. The point can then be used as a base for further observations. Survey-accurate astronomic positions were difficult to observe and calculate and so tended to be a base off which many other measurements were made. Since the advent of the GPS, astronomic observations are rare as GPS allows adequate positions to be determined over most of the surface of the Earth.

=== Reference networks ===
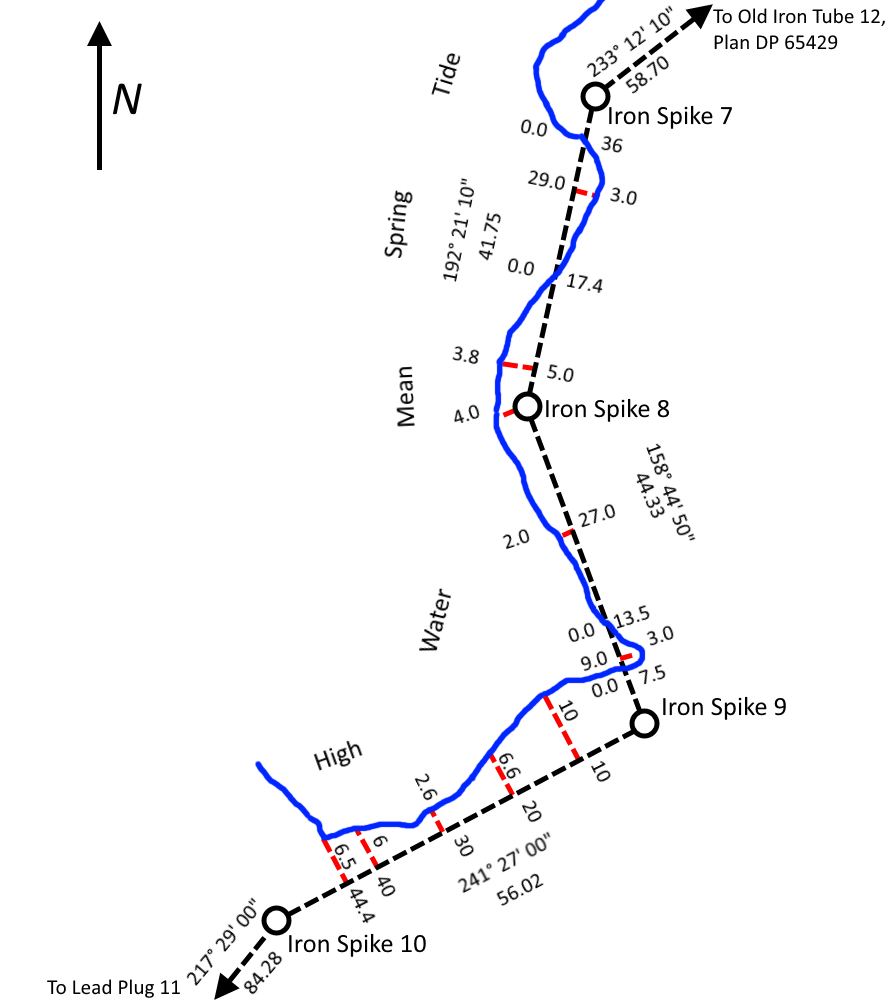
A survey using traverse and offset measurements to record the location of the shoreline shown in blue. Black dashed lines are traverse measurements between reference points (black circles). The red lines are offsets measured at right angles to the traverse lines.

Few survey positions are derived from the first principles. Instead, most survey points are measured relative to previously measured points. This forms a reference or control network where each point can be used by a surveyor to determine their own position when beginning a new survey.

Survey points are usually marked on the earth's surface by objects ranging from small nails driven into the ground, into concrete castings or sidewalks, to large beacons that can be seen from long distances. The surveyors can set up their instruments in this position and measure to nearby objects. Sometimes a tall, distinctive feature such as a steeple or radio aerial has its position calculated as a reference point that angles can be measured against.

Triangulation is a method of horizontal location favoured in the days before EDM and GPS measurement. It can determine distances, elevations and directions between distant objects. Since the early days of surveying, this was the primary method of determining accurate positions of objects for topographic maps of large areas. A surveyor first needs to know the horizontal distance between two of the objects, known as the baseline. Then the heights, distances and angular position of other objects can be derived, as long as they are visible from one of the original objects. High-accuracy transits or theodolites were used, and angle measurements were repeated for increased accuracy. See also Triangulation in three dimensions.

Offsetting is an alternate method of determining the position of objects, and was often used to measure imprecise features such as riverbanks. The surveyor would mark and measure two known positions on the ground roughly parallel to the feature, and mark out a baseline between them. At regular intervals, a distance was measured at right angles from the first line to the feature. The measurements could then be plotted on a plan or map, and the points at the ends of the offset lines could be joined to show the feature.

Traversing is a common method of surveying smaller areas. The surveyors start from an old reference mark or known position and place a network of reference marks covering the survey area. They then measure bearings and distances between the reference marks, and to the target features. Most traverses form a loop pattern or link between two prior reference marks so the surveyor can check their measurements.

==== Datum and coordinate systems ====
Many surveys do not calculate positions on the surface of the Earth, but instead, measure the relative positions of objects. However, often the surveyed items need to be compared to outside data, such as boundary lines or previous surveys' objects. The oldest way of describing a position is via latitude and longitude, and often a height above sea level. As the surveying profession grew it created Cartesian coordinate systems to simplify the mathematics for surveys over small parts of the Earth. The simplest coordinate systems assume that the Earth is flat and measure from an arbitrary point, known as a 'datum' (singular form of data). The coordinate system allows easy calculation of the distances and direction between objects over small areas. Large areas distort due to the Earth's curvature. North is often defined as true north at the datum.

For larger regions, it is necessary to model the shape of the Earth using an ellipsoid or a geoid. Many countries have created coordinate grids customized to lessen error in their area of the Earth.

=== Errors and accuracy ===
A basic tenet of surveying is that no measurement is perfect, and that there will always be a small amount of error. There are three classes of survey errors:

- Gross errors or blunders: Errors made by the surveyor during the survey. Upsetting the instrument, misaiming a target, or writing down a wrong measurement are all gross errors. A large gross error may reduce the accuracy to an unacceptable level. Therefore, surveyors use redundant measurements and independent checks to detect these errors early in the survey.
- Systematic: Errors that follow a consistent pattern. Examples include effects of temperature on a chain or EDM measurement, or a poorly adjusted spirit-level causing a tilted instrument or target pole. Systematic errors that have known effects can be compensated or corrected.
- Random: Random errors are small unavoidable fluctuations. They are caused by imperfections in measuring equipment, eyesight, and conditions. They can be minimized by redundancy of measurement and avoiding unstable conditions. Random errors tend to cancel each other out, but checks must be made to ensure they are not propagating from one measurement to the next.

Surveyors avoid these errors by calibrating their equipment, using consistent methods, and by good design of their reference network. Repeated measurements can be averaged and any outlier measurements discarded. Independent checks like measuring a point from two or more locations or using two different methods are used, and errors can be detected by comparing the results of two or more measurements, thus utilizing redundancy.

Once the surveyor has calculated the level of the errors in their work, it is adjusted. This is the process of distributing the error between all measurements. Each observation is weighted according to how much of the total error it is likely to have caused and part of that error is allocated to it in a proportional way. The most common methods of adjustment are the Bowditch method, also known as the compass rule, and the principle of least squares method.

The surveyor must be able to distinguish between accuracy and precision. In the United States, surveyors and civil engineers use units of feet wherein a survey foot breaks down into 10ths and 100ths. Many deed descriptions containing distances are often expressed using these units (125.25 ft). On the subject of accuracy, surveyors are often held to a standard of one one-hundredth of a foot; about 1/8 inch. Calculation and mapping tolerances are much smaller where achieving near-perfect closures are desired. Though tolerances will vary from project to project, in the field and day-to-day usage beyond a 100th of a foot is often impractical.

== Types ==
Local organisations or regulatory bodies classify specializations of surveying in different ways. Broad groups are:

- As-built survey: a survey that documents the location of recently constructed elements of a construction project. As-built surveys are done for record, completion evaluation and payment purposes. An as-built survey is also known as a 'works as executed survey'. As-built surveys are often presented in red or redline and laid over existing plans for comparison with design information.
- Cadastral or boundary surveying: a survey that establishes or re-establishes boundaries of a parcel using a legal description. It involves the setting or restoration of monuments or markers at the corners or along the boundaries of a parcel. These take the form of iron rods, pipes, or concrete monuments in the ground, or nails set in concrete or asphalt. The ALTA/ACSM Land Title Survey is a standard proposed by the American Land Title Association and the American Congress on Surveying and Mapping. It incorporates elements of the boundary survey, mortgage survey, and topographic survey.
- Control surveying: Control surveys establish reference points to use as starting positions for future surveys. Most other forms of surveying will contain elements of control surveying.
- Construction surveying and engineering surveying: topographic, layout, and as-built surveys associated with engineering design. They often need geodetic computations beyond normal civil engineering practice.
- Deformation survey: a survey to determine if a structure or object is changing shape or moving. First the positions of points on an object are found. A period of time is allowed to pass and the positions are then re-measured and calculated. Then a comparison between the two sets of positions is made.
- Dimensional control survey: This is a type of survey conducted in or on a non-level surface. Common in the oil and gas industry to replace old or damaged pipes on a like-for-like basis, the advantage of dimensional control survey is that the instrument used to conduct the survey does not need to be level. This is useful in the offshore industry, as not all platforms are fixed and are thus subject to movement.
- Foundation survey: a survey done to collect the positional data on a foundation that has been poured and is cured. This is done to ensure that the foundation was constructed in the location, and at the elevation, authorized in the plot plan, site plan, or subdivision plan.
- Hydrographic survey: a survey conducted with the purpose of mapping the shoreline and bed of a body of water. Used for navigation, engineering, or resource management purposes.
- Leveling: either finds the elevation of a given point or establishes a point at a given elevation.
- LOMA survey: Survey to change base flood line, removing property from a Special Flood Hazard Area.
- Measured survey: a building survey to produce plans of the building. Such a survey may be conducted before renovation works, for commercial purposes, or at the end of the construction process.
- Mining surveying: Mining surveying includes directing the digging of mine shafts and galleries and the calculation of the volume of rock. It uses specialised techniques due to the constraints on survey geometry such as vertical shafts and narrow passages.
- Mortgage survey: A mortgage survey or physical survey is a simple survey that delineates land boundaries and building locations. It checks for encroachment, building setback restrictions and shows nearby flood zones. In many places a mortgage survey is a precondition for a mortgage loan.
- Photographic control survey: A survey that creates reference marks visible from the air to allow aerial photographs to be rectified.
- Stakeout, layout or setout: an element of many other surveys where the calculated or proposed position of an object is marked on the ground. This can be temporary or permanent. This is an important component of engineering and cadastral surveying.
- Structural survey: a detailed inspection to report upon the physical condition and structural stability of a building or structure. It highlights any work needed to maintain it in good repair.
- Subdivision: A boundary survey that splits a property into two or more smaller properties.
- Topographic survey: a survey of the positions and elevations of points and objects on a land surface, presented as a topographic map with contour lines.
- Existing conditions: Similar to a topographic survey but instead focuses more on the specific location of key features and structures as they exist at that time within the surveyed area rather than primarily focusing on the elevation, often used alongside architectural drawings and blueprints to locate or place building structures.
- Underwater survey: a survey of an underwater site, object, or area.

=== Plane vs. geodetic surveying ===
Based on the considerations and true shape of the Earth, surveying is broadly classified into two types.

Plane surveying assumes the Earth is flat. Curvature and spheroidal shape of the Earth is neglected. In this type of surveying all triangles formed by joining survey lines are considered as plane triangles. It is employed for small survey works where errors due to the Earth's shape are too small to matter.

In geodetic surveying the curvature of the Earth is taken into account while calculating reduced levels, angles, bearings and distances. This type of surveying is usually employed for large survey works. Survey works up to 100 square miles (260 square kilometers ) are treated as plane and beyond that are treated as geodetic. In geodetic surveying necessary corrections are applied to reduced levels, bearings and other observations.

=== based on the instrument used ===
- Chain Surveying
- Compass Surveying
- Plane table Surveying
- Levelling
- Theodolite Surveying
- Traverse Surveying
- Tacheometric Surveying
- Aerial Surveying

== Profession ==
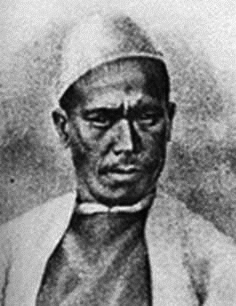
The pundit cartographer Nain Singh Rawat (19th century) received a Royal Geographical Society gold medal in 1876, for his efforts in exploring the Himalayas for the British.

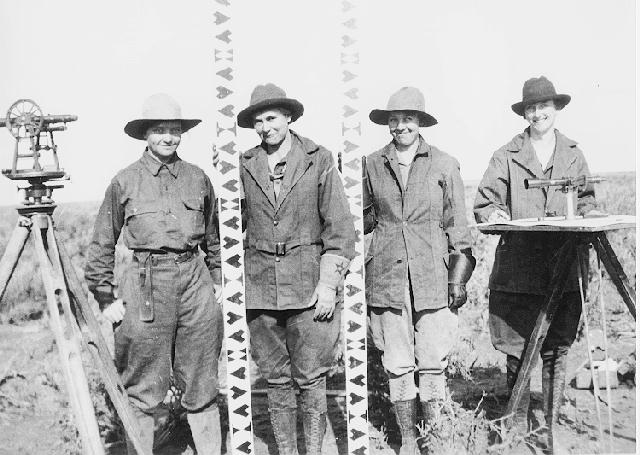
An all-female surveying crew in Idaho, 1918

The basic principles of surveying have changed little over the ages, but the tools used by surveyors have evolved. Engineering, especially civil engineering, often needs surveyors.

Surveyors help determine the placement of roads, railways, reservoirs, dams, pipelines, retaining walls, bridges, and buildings. They establish the boundaries of legal descriptions and political divisions. They also provide advice and data for geographical information systems (GIS) that record land features and boundaries.

Surveyors must have a knowledge of algebra, basic calculus, geometry, and trigonometry. They must also know the laws that deal with surveys, real property, and contracts.

Most jurisdictions recognize three different levels of qualification:

1. Survey assistants or chainmen are usually unskilled workers who help the surveyor. They place target reflectors, find old reference marks, and mark points on the ground. The term 'chainman' derives from past use of measuring chains. An assistant would move the far end of the chain under the surveyor's direction.
2. Survey technicians often operate survey instruments, run surveys in the field, do survey calculations, or draft plans. A technician usually has no legal authority and cannot certify his work. Not all technicians are qualified, but qualifications at the certificate or diploma level are available.
3. Licensed, registered, or chartered surveyors usually hold a degree or higher qualification. They are often required to pass further exams to join a professional association or to gain certifying status. Surveyors are responsible for planning and management of surveys. They have to ensure that their surveys, or surveys performed under their supervision, meet the legal standards. Many principals of surveying firms hold this status.

Related professions include cartographers, hydrographers, geodesists, photogrammetrists, and topographers, as well as civil engineers and geomatics engineers.

=== Licensing ===
Licensing requirements vary with jurisdiction, and are commonly consistent within national borders. Prospective surveyors usually have to receive a degree in surveying, followed by a detailed examination of their knowledge of surveying law and principles specific to the region they wish to practice in, and undergo a period of on-the-job training or portfolio building before they are awarded a license to practise. Licensed surveyors usually receive a post nominal, which varies depending on where they qualified. The system has replaced older apprenticeship systems.

A licensed land surveyor is generally required to sign and seal all plans. The state dictates the format, showing their name and registration number.

In many jurisdictions, surveyors must mark their registration number on survey monuments when setting boundary corners. Monuments take the form of capped iron rods, concrete monuments, or nails with washers.

=== Surveying institutions ===
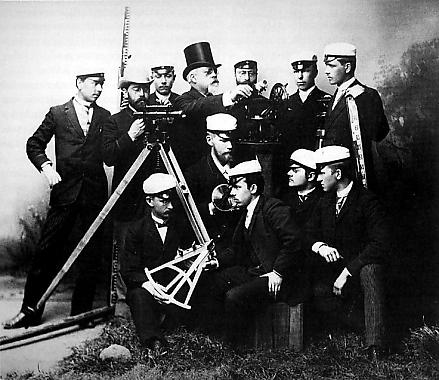
Surveying students with their professor at the Helsinki University of Technology in the late 19th century

Most countries' governments regulate at least some forms of surveying. Their survey agencies establish regulations and standards. Standards control accuracy, surveying credentials, monumentation of boundaries and maintenance of geodetic networks. Many nations devolve this authority to regional entities or states/provinces. Cadastral surveys tend to be the most regulated because of the permanence of the work. Lot boundaries established by cadastral surveys may stand for hundreds of years without modification.

Most jurisdictions also have a form of professional institution representing local surveyors. These institutes often endorse or license potential surveyors, as well as set and enforce ethical standards. The largest institution is the International Federation of Surveyors (Abbreviated FIG, for French: Fédération Internationale des Géomètres). They represent the survey industry worldwide.

=== Building surveying ===
Most English-speaking countries consider building surveying a distinct profession. They have their own professional associations and licensing requirements. A building surveyor can provide technical building advice on existing buildings, new buildings, design, and compliance with regulations such as planning and building control. A building surveyor normally acts on behalf of their client ensuring that their vested interests remain protected. The Royal Institution of Chartered Surveyors (RICS) is a world-recognised governing body for those working within the built environment.

=== Cadastral surveying ===
One of the primary roles of the land surveyor is to determine the boundary of real property on the ground. The surveyor must determine where the adjoining landowners wish to put the boundary. The boundary is established in legal documents and plans prepared by attorneys, engineers, and land surveyors. The surveyor then puts monuments on the corners of the new boundary. They might also find or resurvey the corners of the property monumented by prior surveys.

Cadastral land surveyors are licensed by governments. The cadastral survey branch of the Bureau of Land Management (BLM) conducts most cadastral surveys in the United States. They consult with Forest Service, National Park Service, Army Corps of Engineers, Bureau of Indian Affairs, Fish and Wildlife Service, Bureau of Reclamation, and others. The BLM used to be known as the United States General Land Office (GLO).

In states organized per the Public Land Survey System (PLSS), surveyors must carry out BLM cadastral surveys under that system.

Cadastral surveyors often have to work around changes to the earth that obliterate or damage boundary monuments. When this happens, they must consider evidence that is not recorded on the title deed. This is known as extrinsic evidence.

=== Quantity surveying ===
Unrelated to land surveying, quantity surveying is a profession that deals with the costs and contracts of construction projects. A quantity surveyor is an expert in estimating the costs of materials, labor, and time needed for a project, as well as managing the financial and legal aspects of the project. A quantity surveyor can work for either the client or the contractor, and can be involved in different stages of the project, from planning to completion. Quantity surveyors are also known as Chartered Surveyors in the UK.

== Notable surveyors ==
Some U.S. Presidents were land surveyors. George Washington and Abraham Lincoln surveyed colonial or frontier territories early in their career, before serving in office.

Ferdinand Rudolph Hassler is considered the "father" of geodetic surveying in the U.S.

David T. Abercrombie practiced land surveying before starting an outfitter store of excursion goods. The business would later turn into the Abercrombie & Fitch lifestyle clothing store.

Percy Harrison Fawcett was a British surveyor who explored the jungles of South America attempting to find the Lost City of Z. His biography and expeditions were recounted in the book The Lost City of Z and were later adapted on film screen.

Inō Tadataka produced the first map of Japan using modern surveying techniques starting in 1800.

== See also ==
=== Types and methods ===
- Arc measurement, historical method for determining Earth's local radius
- Photogrammetry, a method of collecting information using aerial photography and satellite images
- Cadastral surveyor, used to document land ownership by the production of documents, diagrams, plats, and maps
  - Dominion Land Survey, the method used to divide most of Western Canada into one-square-mile sections for agricultural and other purposes
  - Public Land Survey System, a method used in the United States to survey and identify land parcels
  - Survey township, a square unit of land, six miles (~9.7 km) on a side, done by the U.S. Public Land Survey System
- Construction surveying, the locating of structures relative to a reference line, used in the construction of buildings, roads, mines, and tunnels
- Deviation survey, used in the oil industry to measure a borehole's departure from the vertical

=== Geospatial survey organizations ===
- Survey of India, India's central agency in charge of mapping and surveying
- Ordnance Survey, a national mapping agency for Great Britain
- U.S. National Geodetic Survey, performing geographic surveys as part of the U.S. Department of Commerce
- United States Coast and Geodetic Survey, a former surveying agency of the United States Government

=== Other ===
- Burt's solar compass – Surveying instrument that uses the Sun's direction instead of magnetism
- Cartography – Study and practice of making maps
- Exsecant – Trigonometric function defined as secant minus one
- International Federation of Surveyors – Global organization for the profession of surveying and related disciplines
- Prismatic compass – Navigation and surveying instrument to measure magnetic bearing
- Royal Institution of Chartered Surveyors
- Survey camp – Civil engineering training course
- Surveying in early America – Mapping Indian land cessions
- Surveying in North America – Survey methods in North America
