= Estartit Loran-C transmitter =

Transmitter in Girona Province, Spain

Estartit Loran-C station
- Estartit within Spain
- Mast height: 195 m (640 ft)
- Coordinates: 42°03′37″N 3°12′16″E

Estartit Loran-C transmitter was a Loran-C transmitter site near Estartit, in Catalonia, Spain. It was part of a chain covering the Mediterranean Sea and started operations in 1962. It closed down in June 1995.

== Loran-C ==
Loran-C is a system of hyperbolic radio navigation which developed from the earlier LORAN system. It uses low frequency signals from beacons to allow the receiver to determine their position. Conventional navigation involves measuring the distance from two known locations, radio navigation works in a similar way but using radio direction finding.

Radio navigation systems use a chain of three or four transmitters which are synchronised. Each chain has a primary station and the others are called secondaries. Each chain has a group repetition interval (GRI) which, multiplied by ten, is the time difference between pulses. The GRI identifies which chain a vessel is receiving.

Loran-C was replaced by civilian satellite navigation systems starting in the 1990s. The first services to close were in the United States and Canada in 2010. In 2014 France and Norway announced they were closing their transmitters, leaving the remaining stations in England and Germany unable to operate. The stations in Norway closed on 31 December 2015.

== Estartit transmitter ==
Loran-C Mediterranean chain

Estartit was a secondary station and part of the Mediterranean Sea chain (GRI 7990) together with Sellia Marina (Italy), Kargaburum (Turkey) and Lampedusa (Italy). It was staffed by the US military coastguard until the US department of defence had no further use for the Loran-C system. It was not transferred to the Spanish authorities and closed in 1995.

The mast was 625 feet (191 m) tall with a log periodic antenna. It had two AN/FPN 39 transmitters. The transmitter power was 165kW.
