= Kargaburun Loran-C transmitter =

Kargaburun Loran-C station
- Kargaburun within Turkey
- Mast height: 195 m (640 ft)
- Coordinates: 40°58′21″N 27°52′2″E
- Built: 1959

Kargaburun Loran-C transmitter was a Loran-C transmitter station located in the Marmara Ereğlisi district of Tekirdağ Province, Turkey. It was part of the Mediterranean chain. The station was opened in 1959 by the US coastguard and closed in 1994.

== Loran-C ==
Loran-C is a system of hyperbolic radio navigation which developed from the earlier LORAN system. It uses low frequency signals from beacons to allow the receiver to determine their position. Conventional navigation involves measuring the distance from two known locations, radio navigation works in a similar way but using radio direction finding.

Radio navigation systems use a chain of three or four transmitters which are synchronised. Each chain has a primary station and the others are called secondaries. Each chain has a group repetition interval (GRI) which, multiplied by ten, is the time difference between pulses. The GRI identifies which chain a vessel is receiving.

Loran-C was replaced by civilian satellite navigation systems starting in the 1990s. The first services to close were in the United States and Canada in 2010. In 2014 France and Norway announced they were closing their transmitters, leaving the remaining stations in England and Germany unable to operate. The stations in Norway closed on 31 December 2015.

== Kargaburan transmitter ==
Loran-C Mediterranean chain

Kargaburan was part of the Mediterranean Sea chain with Sellia Marina (Italy), Estartit (Spain) and Lampedusa (Italy).

Kargaburan was on land owned by the Turkish government and managed under a 1980 co-operation agreement. The station was forced to close in 1975 after a dispute with the Turkish government which led to the closure of all US military facilities in Turkey. It re-opened in 1978.

The transmitter building contained 2 AN/FPN-39 transmitters and the tower was 625 feet (191 m) tall.

On February 25, 1993 the mast radiator collapsed in a snowstorm. The investigation found that this was partly caused by the supports being in the wrong place as the site was on a slight slope. The mast was not rebuilt.
