= Bø Loran-C transmitter =

- Location within Norway
- Coordinates: 68°38′6″N 14°27′47″E
- Built: 1960

Bø Loran-C transmitter was a Loran-C transmitter in Bø Municipality in Vesterålen, Norway. This transmitter was the master station of the Bø chain (GRI 7001) with the other stations being Jan Mayen and Berlevåg. It was also a secondary transmitter of the Ejde chain (GRI 9007), with Ejde and Værlandet It opened in 1960 and closed on 31 December 2015. It had a power of 400 KW.

== Loran-C ==
Loran-C is a system of hyperbolic radio navigation which developed from the earlier LORAN system. It uses low frequency signals from beacons to allow the receiver to determine their position. Conventional navigation involves measuring the distance from two known locations, radio navigation works in a similar way but using radio direction finding.

Radio navigation systems use a chain of three or four transmitters which are synchronised. Each chain has a primary station and the others are called secondaries. Each chain has a group repetition interval (GRI) which, multiplied by ten, is the time difference between pulses. The GRI identifies which chain a vessel is receiving.

Loran-C was replaced by civilian satellite navigation systems starting in the 1990s. The first services to close were in the United States and Canada in 2010. In 2014 France and Norway announced they were closing their transmitters, leaving the remaining stations in England and Germany unable to operate. The stations in Norway closed on 31 December 2015.
