= Jacob Poroo =

- Born: December 1, 1938
- Died: June 18, 1968 (aged 29); Alaska, U.S.
- Other name: Jacob Lauri Arthur Poroo
- Occupation: Coast Guardsman
- Known for: namesake of a USCG cutter

Jacob Poroo (December 1, 1938 – June 18, 1968) was a hospital corpsman for the United States Coast Guard who died of burns suffered when fire struck the remote Alaskan base he was assigned to.

On 2 June 1968, the recreation hall of the Loran-C station at Adak, Alaska, started to burn. After Poroo and other men escaped from the burning building, he re-entered it when he thought he heard cries for help. After he had been terribly burned, a head count determined that no one was missing. A Coast Guard account of the event records that, even though he was horribly burned himself, Poroo guided uninjured men in how to properly care for those who had been burned.

Poroo died on June 18, 1968.

== Legacy ==
A posthumous Coast Guard Medal was awarded to Poroo.

In 2015 the Coast Guard announced that Jacob Poroo would be the namesake of the 25th cutter, USCGC Jacob L. A. Poroo. She was built in Lockport, Louisiana, at the Bollinger shipyards, and delivered to the Coast Guard on September 5, 2017. After completing her sea trials, the cutter was commissioned in December 2017.

=== Coast Guard Medal citation ===
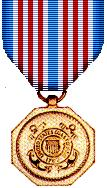

The President of the United States of America takes pride in presenting the Coast Guard Medal (Posthumously) to Hospital Corpsman First Class Jacob Lauri Arthur Poroo, United States Coast Guard, for heroism on the morning of June 2, 1968 when he entered a burning cabin to attempt a rescue on Adak Island, Adak, Alaska. When fire erupted about 3:30 a.m. engulfing the doorway of the old recreation building, Petty Officer Poroo, together with seven other men, successfully escaped. Hearing shouting and believing it to be a cry for help form a trapped companion, he unhesitatingly re-entered the flaming cabin to render assistance with complete disregard for his own safety. Petty Officer Poroo received second and third degree burns over 75 percent of his body before he finally left the burning building, assured that his companions were safe. He then calmly gave sound medical advice to his injured companions until help arrived. Petty Officer Poroo later succumbed to his injuries. His outstanding courage, intrepidity, and unselfish actions were in keeping with the highest traditions of the United States Coast Guard.
