= Jan Mayen Loran-C transmitter =

Transmission facility on the Norwegian island of Jan Mayen

- Location within Europe
- Coordinates: 70°54′51″N 8°43′57″W
- Built: 1960
- Demolished: 2017

The Jan Mayen Loran-C transmitter was a Loran-C transmission facility on the island of Jan Mayen, north east of Iceland and belonging to Norway. The transmitter had a 190-metre tall (625 ft) guyed mast. It was a secondary transmitter in the Bø chain, and a secondary transmitter in the Eiði chain.

This mast was built to replace a 190.5-metre-tall (625 ft) mast, which collapsed in a storm on 8 October, 1980 as the result of low tension on the guy-wires.

Both transmitters on Jan Mayen, together with the other Norwegian Loran-C transmitters at Bø, and those at Eiði in the Danish Faroe Islands, were shut down at midnight on 31 December, 2015.

The mast was demolished in 2017.

== Loran-C ==
Loran-C is a system of hyperbolic radio navigation which developed from the earlier LORAN system. It uses low frequency signals from beacons to allow the receiver to determine their position. Conventional navigation involves measuring the distance from two known locations, radio navigation works in a similar way but using radio direction finding.

Radio navigation systems use a chain of three or four transmitters which are synchronised. Each chain has a primary station and the others are called secondaries. Each chain has a group repetition interval (GRI) which, multiplied by ten, is the time difference between pulses. The GRI identifies which chain a vessel is receiving.

Loran-C was replaced by civilian Satellite navigation systems starting in the 1990s. The first services to close were in the United States and Canada in 2010. In 2014 France and Norway announced they were closing their transmitters, leaving the remaining stations in England and Germany unable to operate. The stations in Norway closed on 31 December 2015.

== See also ==
- List of masts
