= USCGC Jacob Poroo =

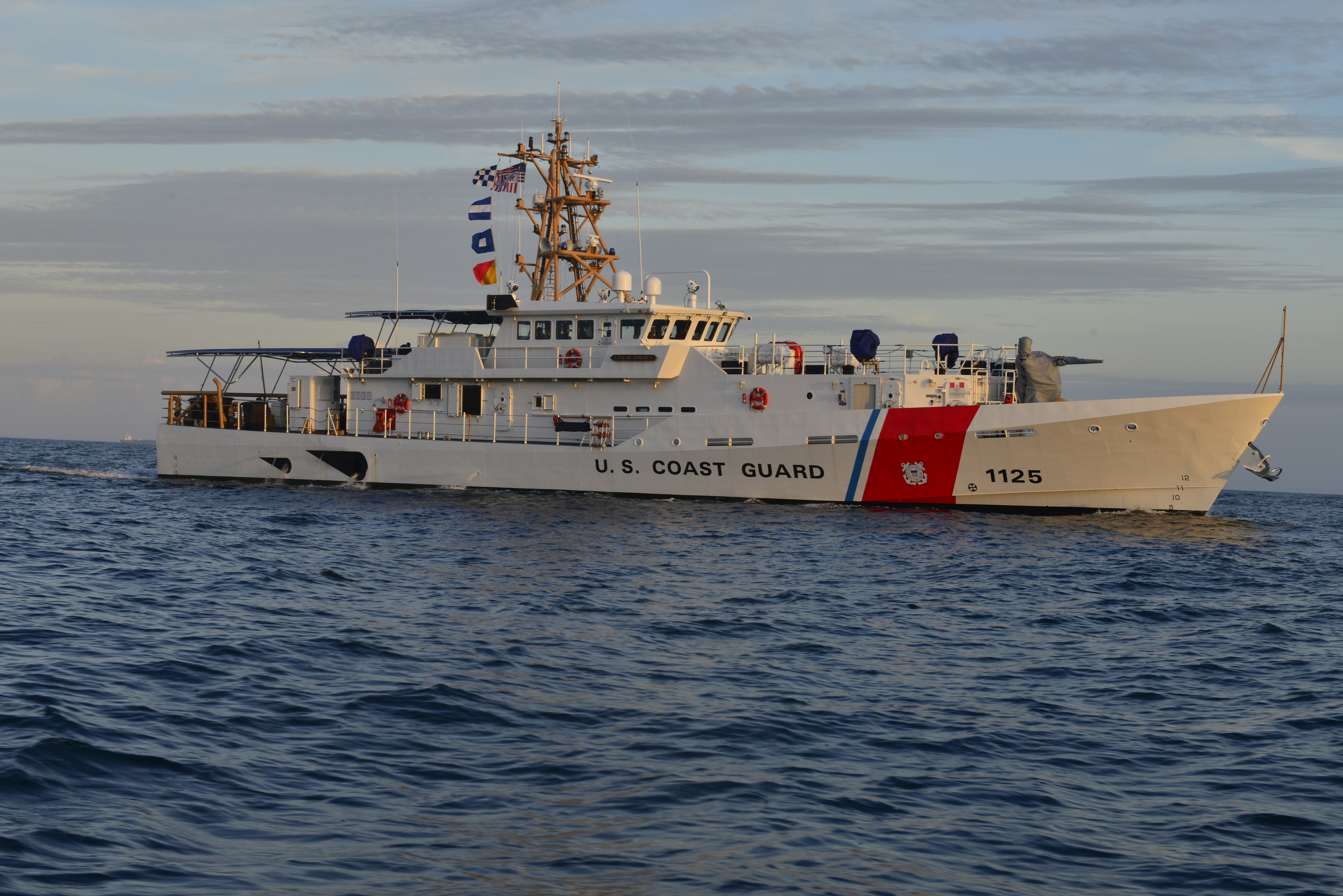
- Jacob Poroo on Patrol

History

United States
- Name: Jacob Poroo
- Namesake: Jacob Poroo
- Operator: United States Coast Guard
- Builder: Bollinger Shipyards, Lockport, Louisiana
- Acquired: September 5, 2017
- Commissioned: November 8, 2017
- Home port: Pascagoula, Mississippi
- Identification: MMSI number: 338926425; Callsign: NJPO; Hull number: WPC-1125
- Status: in active service
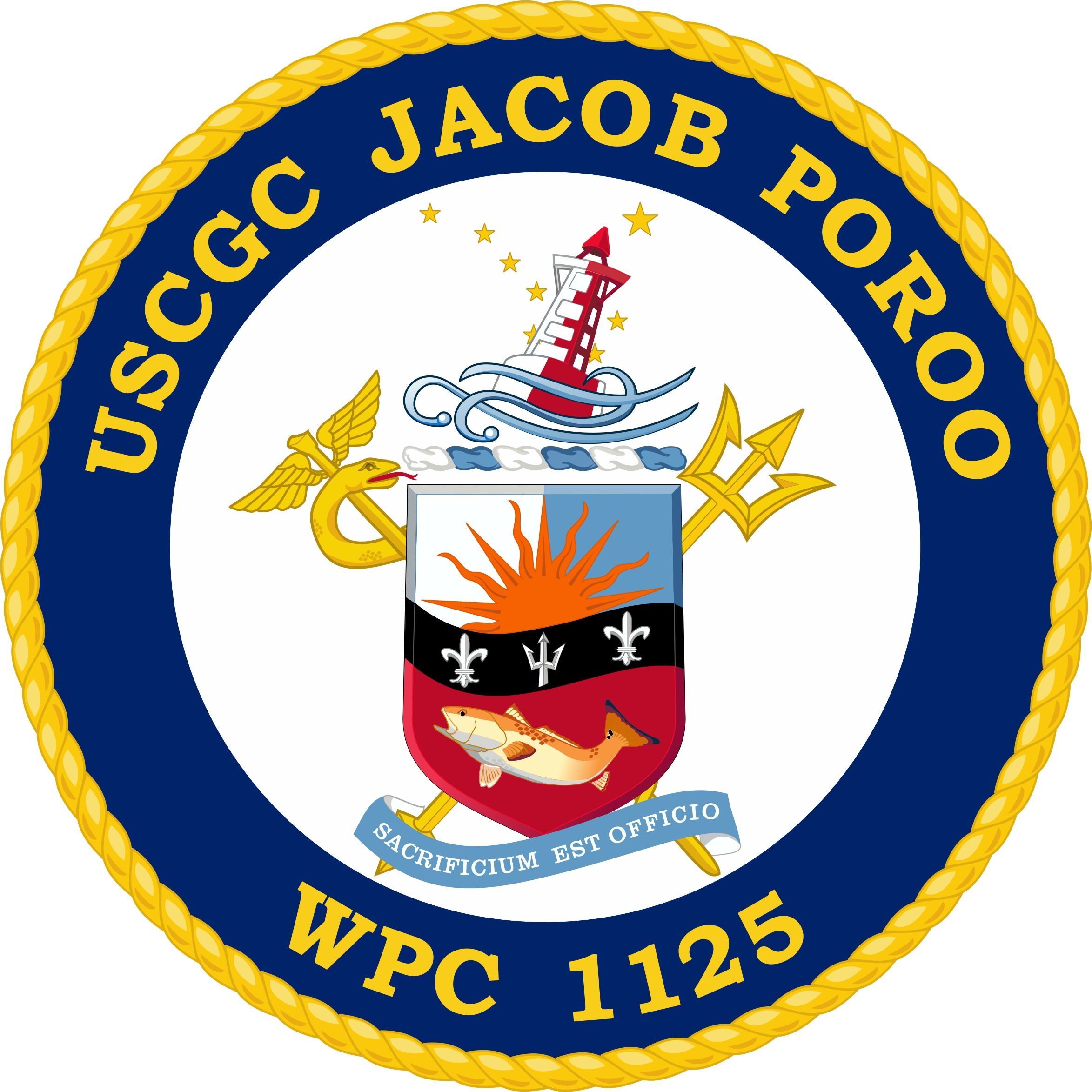
- Badge

General characteristics
- Class & type: Sentinel-class cutter
- Displacement: 353 long tons (359 t)
- Length: 154 ft (47 m)
- Beam: 25 ft (7.6 m)
- Draft: 9.5 ft (2.9 m)
- Speed: 28 knots (52 km/h; 32 mph)
- Range: 2,500 nautical miles (4,600 km; 2,900 mi)
- Endurance: 5 days
- Boats & landing craft carried: 1 × Cutter Boat - Over the Horizon Interceptor
- Complement: 4 officers, 20 enlisted
- Armament: 1 × Mk 38 Mod 2 25 mm automatic gun; 4 × crew-served Browning M2 machine guns

USCGC Jacob Poroo (WPC-1125) is the 25th Sentinel-class cutter. She is homeported in Coast Guard District 8, Pascagoula, Mississippi.

== Design ==
Like her sister ships, she is designed to perform multiple missions, including interception of drug smuggling, coastal security, and search and rescue. She and her sisters are meant to replace the older 1980s-era Island-class patrol boats. Her equipment includes advanced command and control, communications, intelligence, surveillance and reconnaissance, and a cutter deployment ramp to intercept other vessels.

== Namesake ==
She is named after Hospital Corpsman Jacob Poroo who died in a fire at the LORAN station he was at in Adak, Alaska. He escaped from the fire along with other men stationed there, but returned when he heard screaming coming from inside. After he returned with burns, a head count indicated no one was missing. Despite this, he taught uninjured men how to care for the ones who were injured. He died sixteen days later on June 18, 1968, from his injuries.
