= Cecil Hayes =

American interior designer (born 1945)

Cecil Hayes (born 1945) is an interior designer. She was born in Malone, Florida in 1945 and graduated from Dillard High School in Fort Lauderdale, Florida. She started working as an interior designer in the 1970s, and in 1975 opened her own store, Cecil Designs Unlimited. She was the first African American listed in the Architectural Digest Top 100.
