= Rantum Loran-C transmitter =

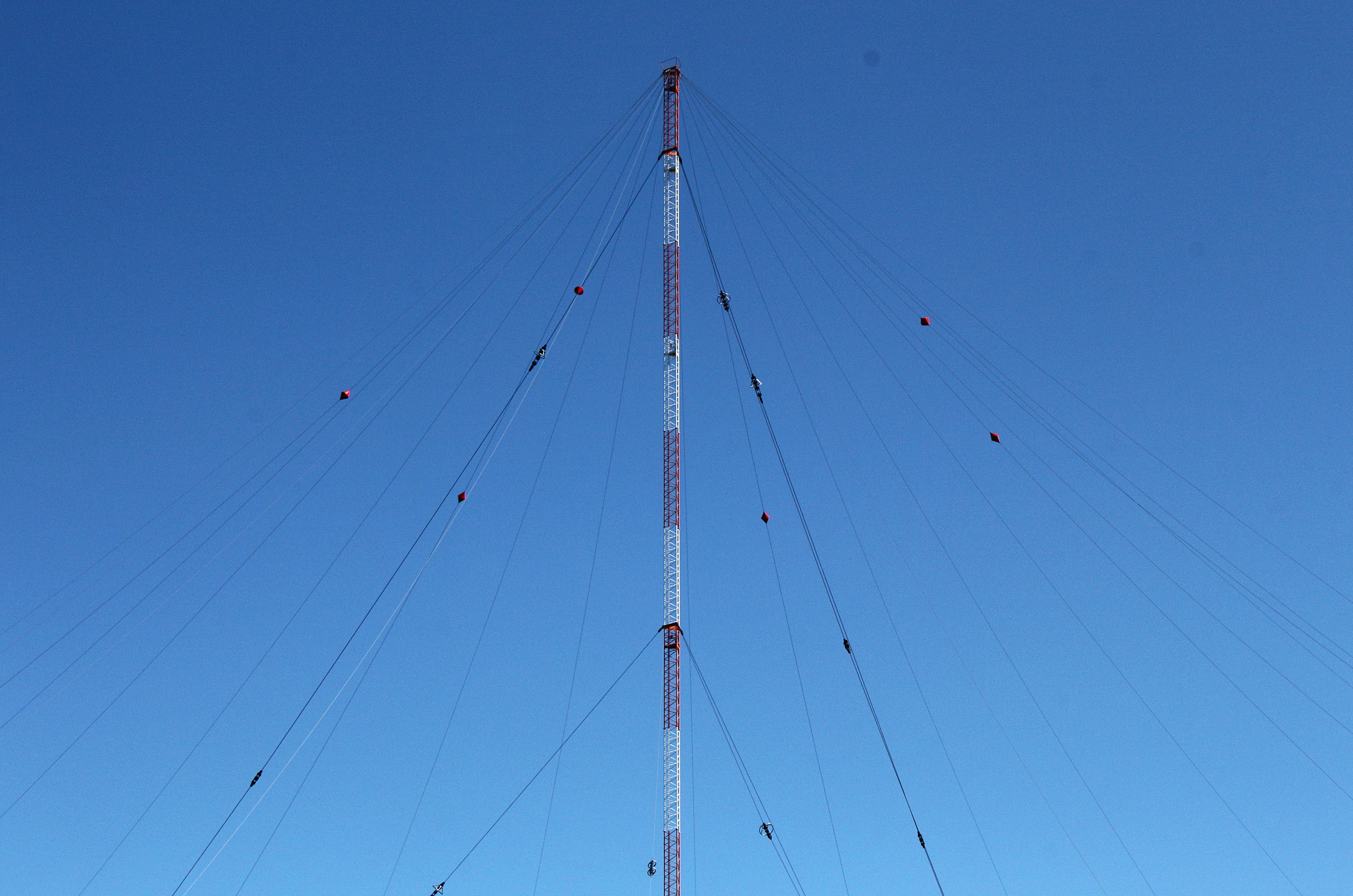
- Rantum Loran-C transmitter

- Sylt in Germany
- Mast height: 195 m (640 ft)
- Coordinates: 54°48′30″N 8°17′37″E

The Rantum Loran-C transmitter (also known as Sylt) was a transmission facility for Loran-C radio navigation on the German island of Sylt near the village of Rantum. Sylt is one of the North Frisian Islands off the coast of Schleswig-Holstein.

== Loran-C ==
Loran-C is a system of hyperbolic radio navigation which developed from the earlier LORAN system. It uses low frequency signals from beacons to allow the receiver to determine their position. Conventional navigation involves measuring the distance from two known locations, radio navigation works in a similar way but using radio direction finding.

Radio navigation systems use a chain of three or four transmitters which are synchronised. Each chain has a primary station and the others are called secondaries. Each chain has a group repetition interval (GRI) which, multiplied by ten, is the time difference between pulses. The GRI identifies which chain a vessel is receiving.

Loran-C was replaced by civilian Satellite navigation systems starting in the 1990s. The first services to close were in the United States and Canada in 2010. In 2014 France and Norway announced they were closing their transmitters, leaving the remaining stations in England and Germany unable to operate. The stations in Norway closed on 31 December 2015.

== Sylt station ==
It was established in 1963 and built by the United States Coast Guard. It was operated by German WSA Tönning between 1989 and 1994. In 1995 it was handed to the German government. The mast was 195m tall and the transmitter had a power of 250 kW. It was part of two Loran chains - Sylt (GRI 7499) and Lessay (GRI 6731). The station closed on 31 December 2015 with the rest of the European Loran-C stations.

There was a fire at the Sylt Loran-C station in 2011.

== See also ==
- List of masts
