= LORAN-C transmitter Carolina Beach =

Coordinates: 34°3′46″N 77°54′46″W

LORAN-C transmitter Carolina Beach was the Zulu secondary station of the U.S. Southeast chain ( GRI 7270) of LORAN-C. The transmitter power was 800 kW. The free-standing antenna of 190.5 metres (625 ft) height was situated near Carolina Beach, North Carolina. After the shutdown of Loran-C in the U.S. in 2010, the transmitter and tower radiator were removed.

In 1958, the tower buckled in Hurricane Helene and collapsed. It was replaced by a guyed mast radiator of same height. The four masts were demolished.

== See also ==
- Radio masts and towers - catastrophic collapses
