= LORAN-C transmitter Malone =

Coordinates: 30°59′39″N 085°10′09″W

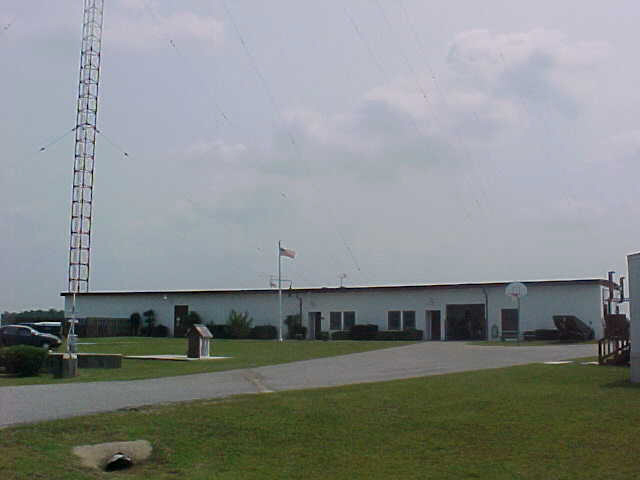
LORAN Station Malone, Malone, Florida

LORAN-C transmitter Malone was the master station of the Southeast U.S. LORAN-C Chain (GRI 7980) and the Whiskey Secondary of the Great Lakes chain (GRI 8970). It used a transmission power of 800 kW for both chains.

Baudette LORAN-C transmitter was situated near Malone in Jackson County, Florida, United States. Malone LORAN-C transmitter used as a 700-foot (213.36 meter) tall mast radiator antenna.

The station was closed on February 8, 2010, as a budget cut. The station, and all of the others, were considered to be obsolete with the general availability of GPS systems. The transmitter has been dismantled.
