= LORAN-C transmitter Gillette =

The LORAN-C transmitter Gillette was a LORAN-C transmission facility near Gillette, Wyoming at . Its aerial, a 700-foot (210 m) guyed radio mast, was the tallest structure in Wyoming at one time.

The station was closed on February 8, 2010, as a budget cut. The station, and all of the others, were considered to be obsolete with the general availability of GPS devices.

== See also ==
- List of masts
