= LORAN-C transmitter Jupiter =

Coordinates: 27°1′59″N 80°6′53″W

LORAN-C transmitter Jupiter was the Yankee secondary station of the Southeast U.S. LORAN-C Chain (GRI 7980). It was operated from years 1962 to 2010 by the U.S. Coast Guard, located on Florida land that was originally Camp Murphy and now Jonathan Dickinson State Park, near the town of Jupiter, Florida. The choice of this site followed the earlier LORAN-A station established in 1957 nearby on the Atlantic beach at Hobe Sound.

The station used a transmission power of 400 kW. The transmitter broadcast on a 190.5 metres (625 ft) tall mast radiator, which was built in 1962. The mast was less than 1,000 feet (300 m) from U.S. Route 1; passing motorists with an AM radio would hear a loud interference from the intense signal overwhelming the auto's receiver.

Until its removal, the mast and its aircraft warning lights provided a prominent visual landmark useful to boaters and mariners for reliable navigation bearings in the southern Treasure Coast and northern Gold Coast waters. The LORAN Tower Ledges coral reef is still named for the facility, which guided dive boats to the submerged location.

In 2004, damaging winds from Hurricane Frances twisted the structural guys on themselves, imposing a slight lean on the mast from vertical.

Radio transmissions were permanently shut down in 2010, and the mast was demolished in July, 2014. The transmitter equipment buildings at the base of the former tower remain, and were turned over to the State of Florida, Division of Recreation and Parks. The 1,750 feet (530 m) diameter circular plat enclosure around the mast is still distinctly visible on aerial and satellite maps.
