= LORAN-C transmitter Johnston Island =

Coordinates: 16°44′44″N 169°30′31″W

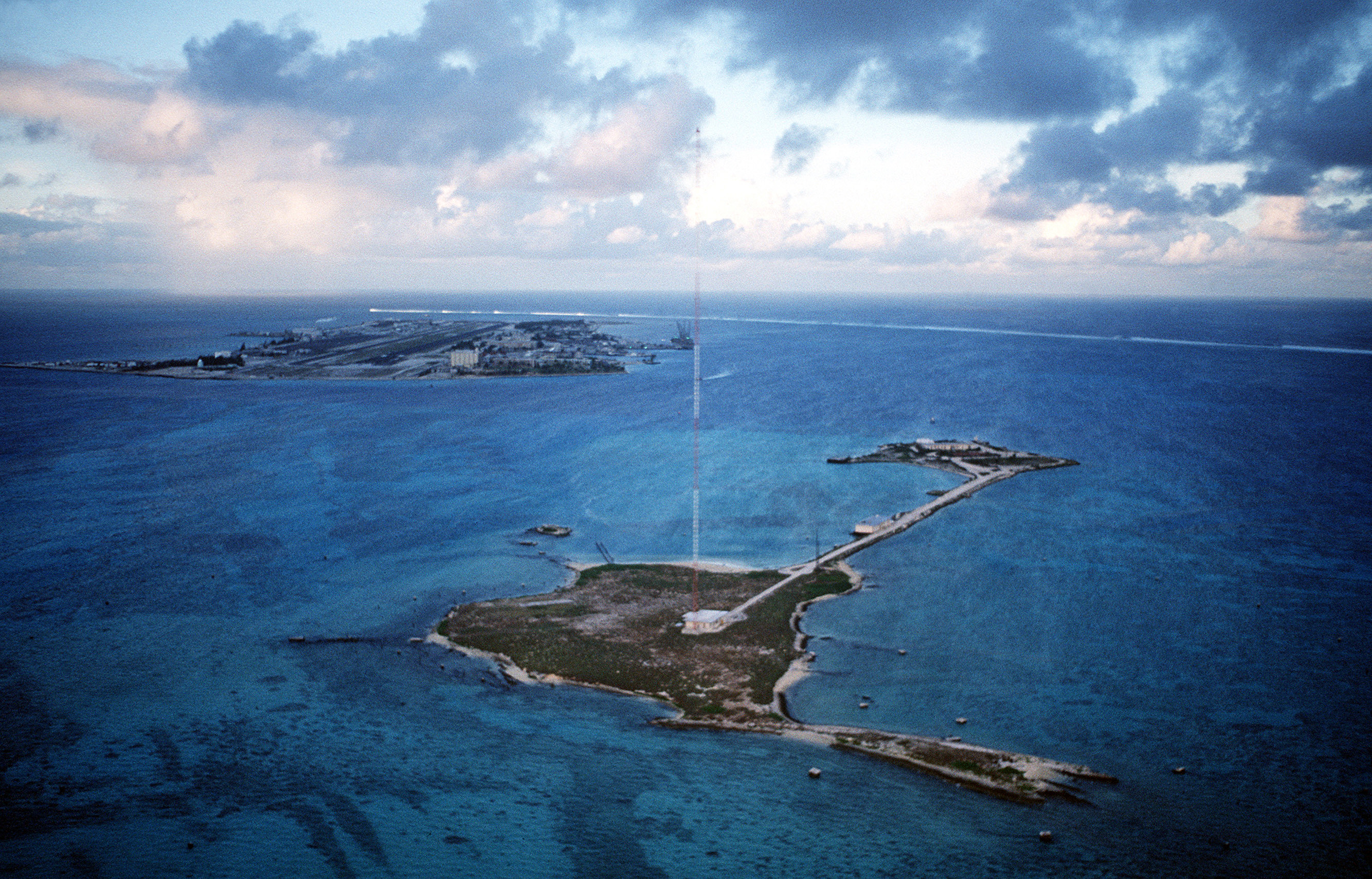
Sand Island in 1990 (foreground) with the U.S. Coast Guard LORAN Station.

LORAN-C transmitter Johnston Island was a LORAN-C transmitter on Johnston Atoll, in the mid-Pacific Ocean. It was in service until July 1, 1992, and used as antenna a 190.5 metre (625 ft) tall mast radiator and a transmission power of 275 kW.

The antenna and all electrical equipment were located on Sand Island, northeast of the main island. Its tall antenna, guyed with four cables, was nearly in line with the extended centerline of the island's runway, so departing aircraft were required to initiate a shallow right turn soon after takeoff to avoid the hazard. Shortly after the LORAN's decommissioning, the antenna was felled to remove that hazard.
