= LORAN-C transmitter Havre =

Station in Havre, Montana

The LORAN-C transmitter Havre was the master station of the North-Central U.S. LORAN-C Chain (GRI 8290), situated at Havre, Montana. It used a 700-foot (210 m) tall mast radiator as an antenna with a transmission power of 400 kW.

The station was closed on February 8, 2010, as a budget cut. The station, and all of the others, were considered to be obsolete with the general availability of GPS systems.
