= LORAN-C transmitter Helong =

LORAN-C transmitter Helong is the Yankee secondary of the China North Sea Loran-C Chain (GRI 7430). It uses a transmission power of 1200 kW. LORAN-C transmitter Helong is situated near Helong at (42°43′12″N 129°6′27″E).
