= Ejde Loran-C transmitter =

Loran-C radio navigation transmitter in Ejde

Eiði Loran-C transmitter
- Eiði in the Faroe Islands
- Mast height: 190 m (620 ft)
- Coordinates: 62°18′0″N 7°4′26″W
- Built: 1960
- Demolished: 2019

Ejde Loran-C transmitter was a Loran-C transmission facility near Eiði on the island of Eysturoy, part of the Faroe Islands. The island is located in the North Atlantic and is part of Denmark.

== Loran-C ==
Loran-C is a system of hyperbolic radio navigation which developed from the earlier LORAN system. It uses low frequency signals from beacons to allow the receiver to determine their position. Conventional navigation involves measuring the distance from two known locations, radio navigation works in a similar way but using radio direction finding.

Radio navigation systems use a chain of three or four transmitters which are synchronised. Each chain has a primary station and the others are called secondaries. Each chain has a group repetition interval (GRI) which, multiplied by ten, is the time difference between pulses. The GRI identifies which chain a vessel is receiving.

Loran-C was replaced by civilian Satellite navigation systems starting in the 1990s. The first services to close were in the United States and Canada in 2010. In 2014 France and Norway announced they were closing their transmitters, leaving the remaining stations in England and Germany unable to operate. The stations in Norway closed on 31 December 2015.

== Eiði Loran transmitter ==
Eiði started operations in 1960 and was part of several Loran-C chains. It was the master station of the Eiði chain (GRI 9007). The 190m mast collapsed on 28 March 1962 making the transmitter at Jan Mayen the master. The mast was rebuilt and the station continued until Loren-C shut down on 31 December 1995. It had transmission power of 400 kW. The site was cleared in 2019
