= LORAN-C transmitter Saint Paul =

Master station of the North Pacific LORAN-C Chain

LORAN-C transmitter Saint Paul was the master station of the North Pacific LORAN-C Chain (GRI 9990). It used a transmission power of 325 kW. Saint Paul LORAN-C transmitter, situated at Saint Paul, Alaska at (57°9′12″N 170°15′6″W). Saint Paul LORAN-C transmitter used as antenna a 190.5 meter (625 ft) tall mast radiator. The mast has been demolished.
