= LORAN-C transmitter Hexian =

LORAN-C transmitter Hexian is the master station of the China South Sea LORAN-C Chain ( GRI 6780 ). It uses a transmission power of 1200 kW. LORAN-C transmitter Hexian is situated near Hexian at (23°58′4″N 111°43′10″E).
