= LORAN-C transmitter Grangeville =

LORAN-C transmitter Grangeville was the Whiskey secondary station of the Southeast U.S. LORAN-C Chain ( GRI 7980). It used a transmission power of 800 kW.

Grangeville LORAN-C transmitter, was situated at Grangeville, Louisiana at 30°43'33" N, 90°49'43" W,(). Grangeville LORAN-C transmitter used a 700-foot (210 m) tall mast radiator.

The station was closed on February 8, 2010, as a budget cut. The station, and all of the others, were considered to be obsolete with the general availability of GPS systems. The transmitter has been dismantled.
