= LORAN-C transmitter George =

Coordinates: 47°3′48″N 119°44′39″W

LORAN-C transmitter George serves the GRI 5990 (Canadian West Coast) and GRI 9940 (US West Coast) chains. Transmission power is 1600 kW. It is located at George, Washington, USA. It went into service in September 1976. In December 2003 its tube transmitters were replaced with solid state units. The antenna consists of four T-antennas mounted on four 211.8 metres (695 feet) tall guyed masts arranged in a 442.3 meters (1,451 feet) square.
