= Malone, Florida =

Town in the state of Florida, United States

- Town
- Location in Jackson County and the state of Florida
- Coordinates: 30°57′32″N 85°09′44″W
- Country: United States
- State: Florida
- County: Jackson
- Settled: c. 1812–1815
- Resettled: c. 1820–1822
- Plattted: c. 1827
- Incorporated: 1911

Government
  - Type: Mayor-Council
  - Mayor: Brandon Watford
  - Councilmembers: Sallie Gibson, Florence Jackson, Kenneth Campbell, Billy Smith, and Terry Taylor
  - Town Clerk: Linda Wilson
  - Town Attorney: Charles M. Wynn

Area
  - Total: 3.05 sq mi (7.90 km^{2})
  - Land: 3.05 sq mi (7.90 km^{2})
  - Water: 0 sq mi (0.00 km^{2})
- Elevation: 138 ft (42 m)

Population (2020)
  - Total: 1,959
  - Density: 642.6/sq mi (248.12/km^{2})
- Time zone: UTC-6 (Central (CST))
  - Summer (DST): UTC-5 (CDT)
- ZIP code: 32445
- Area code(s): 850, 448
- FIPS code: 12-42650
- GNIS feature ID: 2406083

Malone is a town in Jackson County, Florida, United States. The population was 1,959 at the 2020 census.

== Geography ==
Malone is located in northern Jackson County. Florida State Road 2 (FL-SR 2) runs through the center of town as 8th Avenue, leading east 9 miles (14 km) to the Georgia border at the Chattahoochee River, and west 15 miles (24 km) to Campbellton. State Road 71 (FL-SR 71) passes through Malone as 10th Street, crossing FL-SR 2 in the center of town. FL-SR 71 leads north 4 miles (6 km) to the Alabama border and south 15 miles (24 km) to Marianna, the Jackson County seat.

According to the United States Census Bureau, Malone has a total area of 3.1 square miles (8.1 km^{2}), all land.

=== Climate ===
The climate in this area is characterized by hot, humid summers and generally mild winters. According to the Köppen climate classification, the Town of Malone has a humid subtropical climate zone (Cfa).

== Demographics ==
Historical population
Census	Pop.	Note	%±
1930	418		—
1940	442		5.7%
1950	521		17.9%
1960	661		26.9%
1970	667		0.9%
1980	897		34.5%
1990	765		−14.7%
2000	2,007		162.4%
2010	2,088		4.0%
2020	1,959		−6.2%
U.S. Decennial Census

=== Racial and ethnic composition ===
Malone racial composition (Hispanics excluded from racial categories) (NH = Non-Hispanic)
Race	Pop 2010	Pop 2020	% 2010	% 2020
White (NH)	831	736	39.80%	37.57%
Black or African American (NH)	932	910	44.64%	46.45%
Native American or Alaska Native (NH)	5	7	0.24%	0.36%
Asian (NH)	21	0	1.01%	0.00%
Pacific Islander or Native Hawaiian (NH)	0	0	0.00%	0.00%
Some other race (NH)	3	7	0.24%	0.36%
Two or more races/Multiracial (NH)	31	39	1.48%	1.99%
Hispanic or Latino (any race)	265	260	12.69%	13.27%
Total	2,088	1,959		

=== 2020 census ===
As of the 2020 census, Malone had a population of 1,959.

The median age was 36.2 years. 8.1% of residents were under the age of 18 and 7.8% of residents were 65 years of age or older. For every 100 females there were 506.5 males, and for every 100 females age 18 and over there were 637.7 males age 18 and over.

0.0% of residents lived in urban areas, while 100.0% lived in rural areas.

There were 274 households in Malone, of which 33.2% had children under the age of 18 living in them. Of all households, 32.8% were married-couple households, 22.6% were households with a male householder and no spouse or partner present, and 36.5% were households with a female householder and no spouse or partner present. About 33.2% of all households were made up of individuals and 18.2% had someone living alone who was 65 years of age or older.

There were 322 housing units, of which 14.9% were vacant. The homeowner vacancy rate was 0.5% and the rental vacancy rate was 6.8%.

As of 2020, there were 150 families residing in the town.

=== 2010 census ===
As of the 2010 United States census, there were 2,088 people, 429 households, and 316 families residing in the town.

=== 2000 census ===
As of the census of 2000, there were 2,009 people, 311 households, and 199 families residing in the town. The population density was 641.4 inhabitants per square mile (247.6/km^{2}). There were 377 housing units at an average density of 120.5 per square mile (46.5/km^{2}). The racial makeup of the town was 50.77% White, 43.50% African American, 0.85% Native American, 0.10% Asian, 1.64% from other races, and 3.14% from two or more races. Hispanic or Latino of any race were 7.13% of the population.

In 2000, there were 311 households, out of which 28.0% had children under the age of 18 living with them, 42.8% were married couples living together, 19.0% had a female householder with no husband present, and 36.0% were non-families. 34.4% of all households were made up of individuals, and 20.3% had someone living alone who was 65 years of age or older. The average household size was 2.32 and the average family size was 3.01.

In 2000, in the town, the population was spread out, with 9.2% under the age of 18, 9.0% from 18 to 24, 49.6% from 25 to 44, 25.5% from 45 to 64, and 6.7% who were 65 years of age or older. The median age was 37 years. For every 100 females, there were 401.8 males. For every 100 females age 18 and over, there were 482.1 males. (The reason for the extraordinarily high ratio of males to females is due to the presence of an all-male state prison within the city limits.)

In 2000, the median income for a household in the town was $28,611, and the median income for a family was $38,281. Males had a median income of $31,979 versus $19,345 for females. The per capita income for the town was $5,701. About 7.9% of families and 10.8% of the population were below the poverty line, including 12.3% of those under age 18 and 17.5% of those age 65 or over.

== Education ==
Malone public schools are served by the Jackson County School Board.

Malone School houses grades K–12 with approximately 600 students. Malone School earned an "A" on the last FCAT scores.

Malone High School boys basketball program has won 14 state championships. The girls basketball program has won 1 state championship.

== Points of interest ==
- LORAN-C transmitter Malone
- Jackson Correctional Institution

== Notable person ==
- Frank Smith, former MLB baseball player
