= Lampedusa Loran-C transmitter =

LORAN-C transmitter in Italy

Coordinates: 35°31′21″N 12°31′31″E

LORAN-C transmitter Lampedusa was the X-Ray secondary station of the Mediterranean Sea LORAN-C Chain (GRI 7990), situated on the Italian island of Lampedusa. It used a transmission power of 325 kW. The antenna was a 190.5 metre (625 ft) tall mast radiator, which was commissioned in 1972. An Omega monitoring station was also constructed on the base. The LORAN Station ceased transmission on 312400Z DEC 94 and was decommissioned in January 1995.

== History ==
The Loran station was relocated to Lampedusa from Libya in 1972.

In 1979, Lt. Kay Hartzell took command of the Coast Guard base, becoming the first female commanding officer of an isolated U.S. military base.

On April 15, 1986, Libya fired two Scuds at the U.S. Coast Guard navigation station on the Italian island, in retaliation for the American bombing of Tripoli and Benghazi. However, the missiles fell short of the island, causing no damage.

At the time of the missile attack, the LORAN station was under the command of Lt. Ernest DelBueno. DelBueno had spent the previous winter arming the crew and hardening the station against a possible terrorist attack. DelBueno received orders to evacuate non-essential members of the crew to the U.S. Naval Air Station in Sigonella, Sicily and to stay behind with a small team to keep the signal on air. The commander of a U.S. Navy transport helicopter from Helicopter Combat Support Squadron Four (HC-4), upon landing advised DelBuono that he had received orders to evacuate the entire crew. Unable to communicate with his superiors in London, DelBueno and the crew left the base. They returned early the next morning. The incident damaged relations with some of the local Italians. Despite additional threats from Qaddafi throughout the spring of 1986, the station continued to provide signal availability to NATO forces. Prior to leaving at the end of his tour in July 1986, DelBueno installed enhanced secure communications equipment, fences and additional weapons to ensure that future commanding officers had the equipment to respond to potential terrorist threats.

As a result of the attack, the Coast Guard station was commissioned as a NATO base, controlled by Italy, including security hardening and an armory, as well as an Italian security detail stationed nearby. The NATO base was decommissioned in 1994 and transferred to Italian military control. It can still be seen clearly on Google Earth (keyword: Lampedusa), at the west end of the island, with swimming pool and outbuildings visible.
