= LORAN =

Radio navigation system

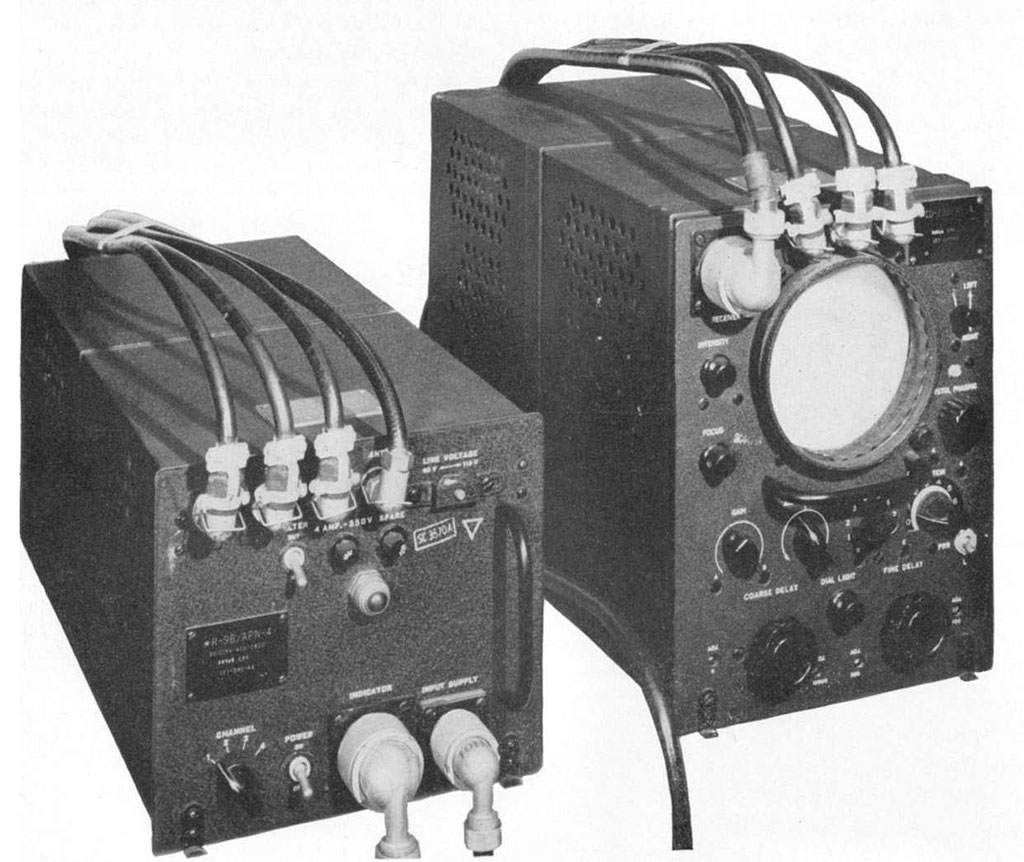
The AN/APN-4 was an airborne LORAN receiver used into the 1960s. It was built in two parts to match the UK's Gee system, and could be swapped with Gee in a few minutes.

LORAN (Long Range Navigation) (Note: According to some sources, this originally stood for "Loomis Navigation System", or LRN, before being backronymed to LORAN.) was a hyperbolic radio navigation system developed in the United States during World War II. It was similar to the UK's Gee system, but operated at lower frequencies in order to provide an improved range up to 1,500 miles (2,400 km) with an accuracy of tens of miles. It was first used for ship convoys crossing the Atlantic Ocean, and then by long-range patrol aircraft, but found its main use on the ships and aircraft operating in the Pacific theater during World War II.

LORAN, in its original form, was an expensive system to implement, requiring a cathode ray tube (CRT) display and a well-trained operator. This limited use to the military and large commercial users. Automated receivers became available in the 1950s, but the same improved electronics also opened the possibility of new systems with higher accuracy. The United States Navy began development of Loran-B, which offered accuracy on the order of a few tens of feet, but ran into significant technical problems. The United States Air Force worked on a different concept, Cyclan, which offered longer range than LORAN and accuracy of hundreds of feet. When the Air Force turned their attention to inertial navigation systems, the Navy took over Cyclan and renamed it Loran-C. The United States Coast Guard took over operations of both LORAN systems in 1958.

Despite the dramatically improved performance of Loran-C, LORAN, now known as Loran-A (or "Standard LORAN"), would become much more popular during this period. This was due largely to the large numbers of surplus Loran-A units released from the Navy as ships and aircraft replaced their sets with Loran-C. The widespread introduction of inexpensive microelectronics during the 1960s caused Loran-C receivers to drop in price dramatically, and Loran-A use began to rapidly decline. The Loran-A transmitter network was slowly dismantled starting in the 1970s; it remained active in North America until 1980 and the rest of the world until 1985. A Japanese chain remained on the air until May 9, 1997, and a Chinese chain was still listed as active as of 2000.

Loran-A used two frequency bands, at 1.85 and 1.95 MHz. These same frequencies in the 160-meter band were used by amateur radio operators, and they were under strict rules to operate at reduced power levels to avoid interference; depending on their location and distance to the shore, U.S. operators were limited to maximums of 200 to 500 watts during the day and 50 to 200 watts at night.

== History ==
=== Project 3 ===
At a 1 October 1940 meeting of the U.S. Army Signal Corps' Technical Committee, Alfred Loomis, chair of the Microwave Committee of the National Defense Research Committee, proposed building a hyperbolic navigation system. He predicted that such a system could provide an accuracy of 1,000 feet (300 m) or better at a range of 200 miles (320 km), and a maximum range of 300–500 miles (480–800 km) for high-flying aircraft. This led to the "Precision Navigational Equipment for Guiding Airplanes" specification, which was sent back to the Microwave Committee and formed up as "Project 3". (Note: A number of sources quote one of the LORAN researchers stating that the effort was actually known as "Project C", not 3. However, other sources illustrate that other projects at the Rad Lab were known by number, for instance, the effort to develop a microwave air-to-air radar was Project 1, and a ground-based anti-aircraft system was Project 2. See Bowen's "Radar Days", p. 183.) Orders for initial systems were sent out at a follow-up meeting on 20 December 1940. Edward George Bowen, developer of the first airborne radar systems, was also at the 20 December meeting. He stated that he was aware of similar work in the UK, but didn't know enough about it to offer any suggestions.

Project 3 moved to the newly-formed MIT Radiation Laboratory's Navigation Group in 1941. Early systems operated around 30 MHz, but it was later decided to try experiments with different equipment that could be tuned from 3 to 8 MHz. These lower frequency systems were found to be much more stable electronically. After first considering setting up transmitters on mountain peaks, the team instead settled on two abandoned Coast Guard stations at Montauk Point, New York, and Fenwick Island, Delaware. On the receiving end, a station wagon was fitted with a simple receiver and sent around the country looking for solid signals, which were found as far away as Springfield, Missouri.

For a production system, the team began working with a system using a circular J-scope display for improved accuracy. The more common A-scope represents distances across the diameter of the tube, while the J-scope presents this as the angle around the cathode ray tube's face. This increases the amount of room on the scale by a factor of π for any given display size, improving accuracy. In spite of using the J-scope, and adopting the lower frequency change for more stability, the team found accurate measurements of range quite difficult. At the time, the procedure for generating sharp pulses of signals was in its infancy, and their signals were considerably spread out in time, making measurements difficult.

By this time the team had become aware of the UK's Gee efforts, and were aware that Gee used a system of electronically generated strobes that produced pips on the display that were accurately aligned with system timing. They sent a team to the UK to learn about the strobe concept, and immediately adopted it for their work. As part of this exchange, the Project 3 team also found that Gee was almost identical to their own system in concept and desired performance. Unlike their system, Gee had largely completed development and was proceeding to production. The decision was made to abandon the current efforts, use Gee on their own aircraft, and re-develop their system for the long-range role instead.

=== LORAN ===
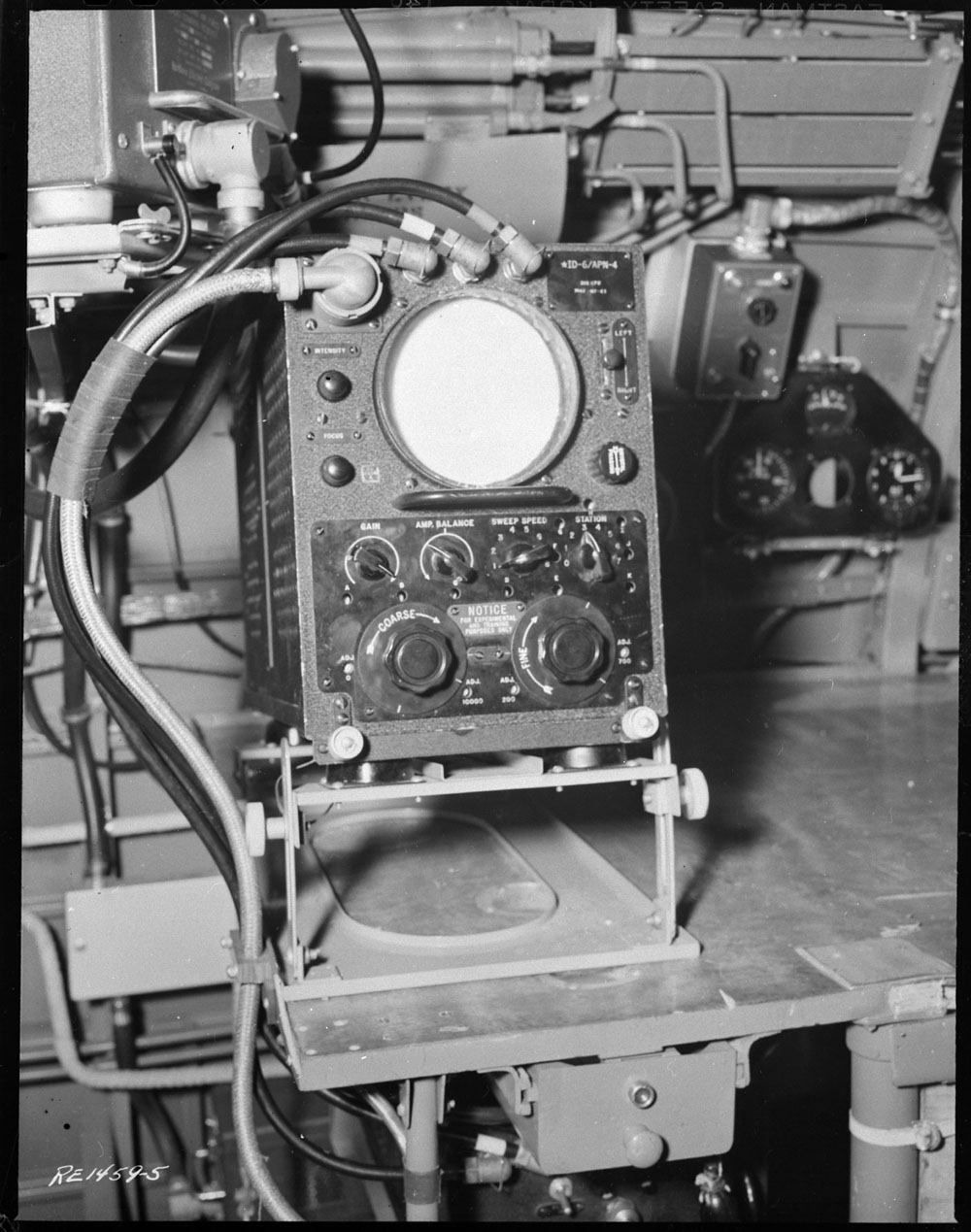
AN/APN-4 LORAN in RCAF Canso (PBY) aircraft

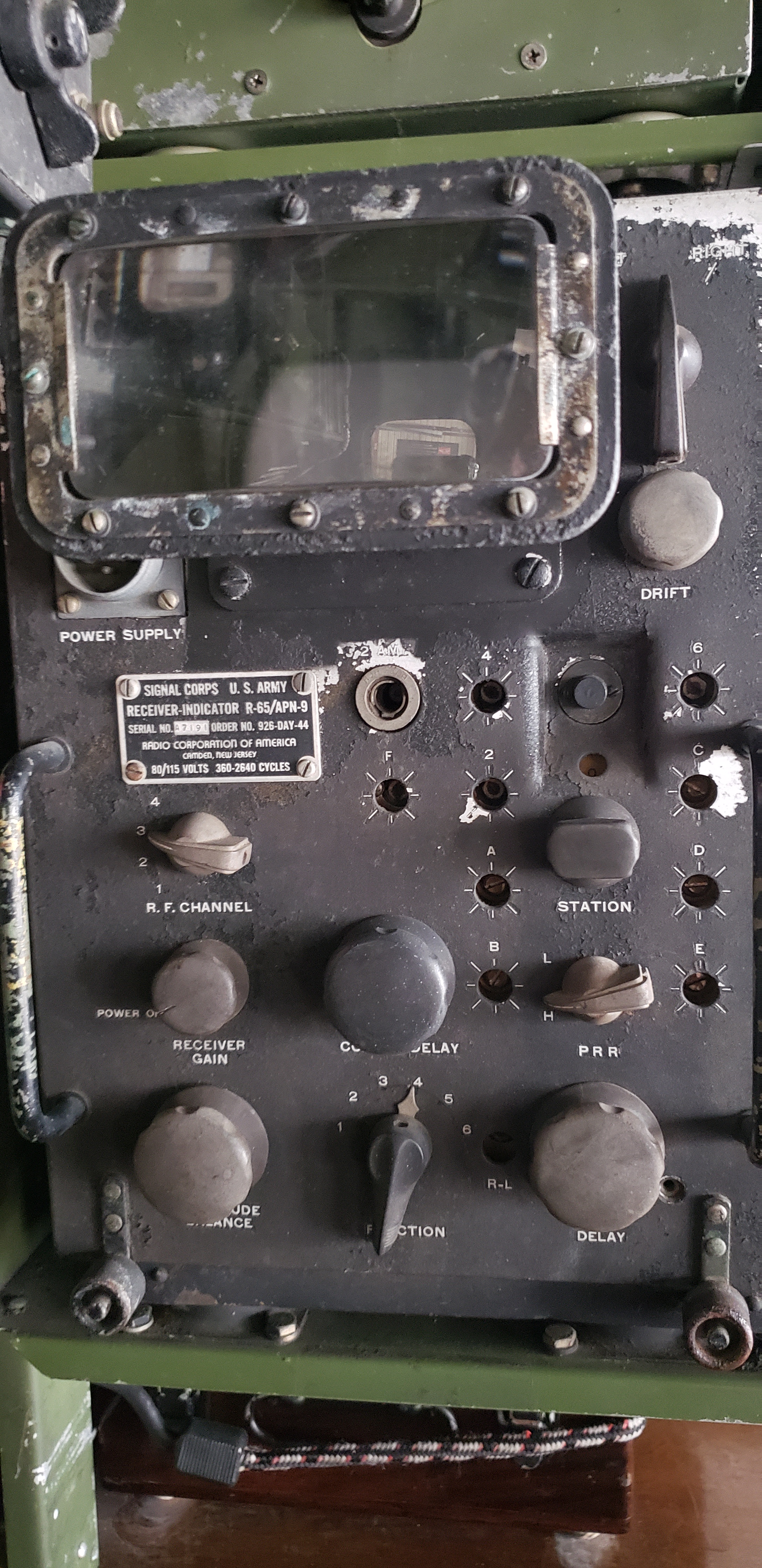
R-65/APN-9 in a B-17G aircraft

The decision to switch to the long-range role meant that the high accuracy of the Gee system was not needed, which greatly reduced the need to address the timing problems. This change in purpose also demanded the use of even lower frequencies, which could reflect off the ionosphere at night and thus provide over-the-horizon operation. Two frequency bands were initially selected, 1.85 and 1.95 MHz for nighttime use (160 meters), and 7.5 MHz (40 meters). The 7.5 MHz, labeled "HF" on early receivers, was never used operationally.

In mid-1942, Robert Dippy, the lead developer of the Gee system at the Telecommunications Research Establishment (TRE) in the UK, was sent to the U.S for eight months to help with LORAN development. At the time the project was being driven primarily by Captain Harding of the U.S. Navy, and they were concentrating entirely on a shipboard system. Dippy convinced them that an airborne version was definitely possible, leading to some interest by the United States Army Air Forces (USAAF). The Navy was unhappy about this turn of events. Dippy also instituted a number of simple changes that would prove extremely useful in practice. Among these, he outright demanded that the airborne LORAN receivers be built physically similar to the Gee receivers, so that they could be swapped out in service simply by replacing the receiver unit. This would prove extremely useful; RAF Transport Command aircraft could swap their receivers when moving to or from the Australian theatre. Dippy also designed the ground station timing equipment.

It was around this time that the project was joined by both the U.S. Coast Guard and the Royal Canadian Navy. The project was still top secret at this time, and little actual information was shared, especially with the Coast Guard. The Canadian liaison was required, as ideal siting for the stations would require several stations in various locations in the Canadian Maritime Provinces. One site in Nova Scotia proved to be a battle; the site was owned by a fisherman whose domineering teetotaler wife was dead set against having anything to do with the sinful Navy men. When the site selection committee of J.A. Waldschmitt and Lt. Cdmr. Argyle were discussing the matter with the husband, a third visitor arrived and he offered the men cigarettes. They refused, and the hostess then asked if they drank. When they said they did not, the land was quickly secured.

LORAN was soon ready for deployment, and the first chain went live in June 1942 at Montauk Point and Fenwick Island. This was joined shortly thereafter by two stations in Newfoundland, at Cape Bonavista and Battle Harbour, Labrador, and then by two stations in Canada—Nova Scotia, at Baccaro and Deming Island. Additional stations all along the U.S. and Canadian east coast were installed through October, and the system was declared operational in early 1943. By the end of that year additional stations had been installed in Greenland, Iceland, the Faroe Islands and the Hebrides, offering continuous coverage across the North Atlantic. RAF Coastal Command had another station installed in Shetland, offering coverage over Norway, a major staging ground for German U-boats and capital ships.

=== Expansion ===
LORAN chart of the Yellow Sea, 1944

The enormous distances and lack of useful navigation points in the Pacific Ocean led to widespread use of LORAN for both ships and aircraft during the Pacific War. In particular, the accuracy offered by LORAN allowed aircraft to reduce the amount of extra fuel they would otherwise have to carry to ensure they could find their base after a long mission. This reduced fuel load allowed the bombload to be increased. By the end of World War II there were 72 LORAN stations, with over 75,000 receivers in use.

Additional chains in the Pacific were added in the post-war era. A spurt in construction followed the opening of the Korean War, including new chains in Japan and one at Busan, Korea. Chains were also installed in China, prior to the ultimate end of the Chinese Communist Revolution, and these stations remained on the air at least into the 1990s. A final major expansion took place in Portugal and the Azores in 1965, offering additional coverage to the mid-Atlantic.

=== SS LORAN ===
During early experiments with LORAN's skywaves, Jack Pierce noticed that at night the reflective layer in the ionosphere was quite stable. This led to the possibility that two LORAN stations could be synchronized using skywave signals, at least at night, allowing them to be separated over much greater distances. Accuracy of a hyperbolic system is a function of the baseline distance, so if the stations could be spread out, the system would become more accurate, so fewer stations would be needed for any desired navigational task.

A test system was first attempted on 10 April 1943 between the LORAN stations at Fenwick and Bonavista, 1,100 miles (1,800 km) away. This test demonstrated accuracy of ½ mile, significantly better than normal LORAN. This led to a second round of tests in late 1943, this time using four stations, Montauk, East Brewster, Massachusetts, Gooseberry Falls, Minnesota, and Key West, Florida. Extensive evaluation flights revealed an average error of 1–2 miles (1.6–3.2 km).

The nighttime mode of operation was a perfect fit for RAF Bomber Command. The four test stations were dismantled and shipped across the Atlantic, and re-installed to form two chains, Aberdeen–Bizerte, and Oran–Benghazi. Known as Skywave-Synchronized LORAN, or SS LORAN, the system provided coverage anywhere south of Scotland and as far east as Poland with an average accuracy of one mile. The system was used operationally in October 1944, and by 1945 it was universally installed in No. 5 Group RAF.

The same basic concept was also tested post-war by the U.S. Coast Guard in a system known as "Skywave Long Baseline LORAN". The only difference was the selection of different frequencies, 10.585 MHz in the day, and 2 MHz at night. Initial tests were carried out in May 1944 between Chatham, Massachusetts, and Fernandina Beach, Florida, and a second set between Hobe Sound, Florida, and Point Chinato, Puerto Rico, in December–January 1945–1946. Due to a lack of suitable frequency allocations, the system was not put into operation.

=== Loran-B and C ===
LORAN was a simple system that compared the arrival times of pulses to make a measurement. Ideally, perfectly formed rectangular blips would be displayed on the CRT, whose leading edge could be compared with a high degree of accuracy. In practice, the transmitters cannot turn on and off instantly, and due to a variety of factors the resulting blips are spread out in time, forming an envelope. The sharpness of the envelope is a function of the frequency, meaning the lower-frequency systems like LORAN will always have longer envelopes with less well-defined start and stop points, and thus generally have less accuracy than higher-frequency systems like Gee.

There is an entirely different way to accomplish the same timing measurement, not by comparing the timing of the pulse envelopes, but timing the phase of the signals. This is actually quite easy to perform using simple electronics and can be displayed directly using a simple mechanical pointer. The trick to such a system is to ensure the primary and secondary stations are phase-coherent, a complex proposition during World War II. By isolating the expensive portions of the system at the few broadcast stations, the Decca Navigator System went active in 1944 using this technique, offering accuracy similar to Gee, but using low-cost mechanical displays, which were also much easier to use.

The downside to the phase comparison system is that it is not possible to know from a continuous wave signal, like Decca's, which part of the signal one is measuring. One could be comparing the first waveform from one station to the first from another, but the second waveform looks identical and the operator may line up those two waves instead. This leads to a problem where the operator can generate an accurate measurement, but the actual fix might be at a wide variety of locations. These locations are separated radially around the station, meaning a fix might be within a given radial direction or a fixed distance to either side. Decca referred to these radial areas as "lanes", and used a mechanical system to keep track of in which one the receiver was.

By combining the two concepts, envelope timing and phase comparison, both of these problems could be eliminated. Since phase comparison is generally more accurate at low frequencies due to details of the electronics, taking accurate fixes would be based on this technique. But instead of broadcasting a continuous signal, as in the case of Decca, the signal would be in the form of pulses. These would be used to make a rough fix using the same technique as Gee or LORAN, positively identifying the lane. The only problem from a development standpoint would be selecting frequencies that allowed reasonably accurate pulse envelopes while still having measurable waveforms within the pulses, as well as developing displays capable of showing both the pulses as a whole, and the waves within them.

These concepts led to experiments with Low Frequency LORAN in 1945, using a much lower frequency of 180 kHz. A system with three transmitters was set up on the U.S. east coast using long antennas supported by balloons. The experiments demonstrated that the inaccuracy inherent to the design while working at such low frequencies was simply too great to be useful; operational factors introduced errors that overwhelmed the capabilities. Nevertheless, the three transmitters were re-installed in northern Canada and Alaska for experiments in polar navigation, and ran for three years until shutting down again in March 1950. These experiments demonstrated accuracy on the order of 0.15 microseconds, or about 50 metres (0.031 miles), a great advance over LORAN. Maximum usable range was 1,000 miles (1,600 km) over land and 1,500 miles (2,400 km) on the sea. Using cycle matching, the system demonstrated an accuracy of 160 feet (49 m) at 750 miles (1,210 km). But it was also discovered that the system was very difficult to use and the measurements remained subject to confusion over which cycles to match.

During this same period, the USAAF became interested in a very-high accuracy system for bombing pinpoint targets. Raytheon won a contract to develop a system called "Cytac", which used the same basic techniques as LF LORAN, but included considerable automation to handle the timing internally without operator intervention. This proved to be extremely successful, with test-runs placing the aircraft within 10 yards of the target. As the mission changed from short-range tactical bombing to over-the-pole nuclear delivery, the (newly formed U.S. Air Force lost interest in the concept. Nevertheless, they continued experimentation with the equipment after adapting it to work on LF LORAN frequencies and renaming it "Cyclan", lowering accuracy compared to the original, but providing reasonable accuracy on the order of a mile at greatly increased distances.

The Navy had also been experimenting with a similar concept during this period, but using a different method to extract the timing. This system, later known as Loran-B, ran into significant problems (as did another Air Force system, Whyn and a similar British system, POPI). In 1953 the Navy took over the Cyclan system and began a wide series of studies ranging as far away as Brazil, demonstrating accuracy to about 100 meters (330 ft). The system was declared operational in 1957, and operations of LORAN and Cyclan were handed to the U.S. Coast Guard in 1958. At that time, the original LORAN became Loran-A or standard LORAN, and the new system became Loran-C. (Note: In spite of the official naming being established early on, many references use all-caps for all of these systems. This includes many official documents from the U.S Coast Guard)

=== Commercial use, decommissioning ===
Despite the greatly increased accuracy and ease-of-use of Loran-C, Loran-A remained in widespread use. This was due largely to two important factors. One was that the electronics needed to read a Loran-C signal were complex, and in the era of tube-based electronics, physically very large, generally fragile, and expensive. Further, as military ships and aircraft moved from Loran-A to Loran-C, the older receivers were made surplus. These older units were snapped up by commercial fishermen and other users, keeping it in widespread service.

Loran-A continued to improve as the receivers were transistorized and then automated using microcontroller-based systems that decoded the location automatically. By the early 1970s such units were relatively common, although they remained relatively expensive compared to devices like radio direction finders. The improvement of electronics through this period was so rapid that it was only a few years before Loran-C units of similar size and cost were available. This led to the decision to open Loran-C to civilian use in 1974.

By the late 1970s, the Coast Guard was in the midst of phasing out Loran-A in favor of additional Loran-C chains. The Aleutian and Hawaii chains shut down on 1 July 1979, the remaining Alaska and West Coast chains on 31 December 1979, followed by the Atlantic and Caribbean transmitters on 31 December 1980. Several foreign chains in both the Pacific and Atlantic followed suit, and by 1985 most of the original chains were no longer operational. Japanese systems remained on the air longer, until 1991, serving their fishing fleet. Chinese systems were active into the 1990s before their replacement with more modern systems, and their nine chains were still listed as active in Volume 6 (2000 edition) of the Admiralty List of Radio Signals.

== Operation ==
A single leg of a LORAN system lies along the "baseline" from stations A to B. At any point between these stations, a receiver will measure a difference in timing of the two pulses. This same delay will occur in many other locations along a hyperbolic curve. A navigational chart showing a sample of these curves produces a graph like this image.

=== Basic concept ===
Hyperbolic navigation systems can be divided into two main classes, those that calculate the time difference between two radio pulses, and those that compare the phase difference between two continuous signals. To illustrate the basic concept, this section will consider the pulse method only.

Consider two radio transmitters located at a distance of 300 kilometers (190 mi) from each other, which means the radio signal from one will take 1 millisecond to reach the other. One of these stations is equipped with an electronic clock that periodically sends out a trigger signal. When the signal is sent, this station, the "primary", sends out its transmission. 1 ms later, that signal arrives at the second station, the "secondary". This station is equipped with a receiver, and when it sees the signal from the primary arrive, it triggers its own transmitter. This ensures that the primary and secondary send out signals precisely 1 ms apart, without the secondary needing an accurate timer of its own or to synchronize its clock with the primary. In practice, a fixed time is added to account for delays in the receiver electronics.

A receiver listening for these signals and displaying them on an oscilloscope will see a series of "blips" on the display. By measuring the distance between them, the delay between the two signals can be calculated. For instance, a receiver might measure the distance between the two blips to represent a delay of 0.5 ms. This implies that the difference in the distance to the two stations is 150 km. There is an infinite number of locations where that delay could be measured – 75 km from one station and 225 from the other, 150 km from one and 300 from the other, and so on.

When plotted on a chart, the collection of possible locations for any given time difference forms a hyperbolic curve. The collection of curves for all possible measured delays forms a set of curved radiating lines, centered on the line between the two stations, known as the "baseline". In order to take a fix, the receiver takes two measurements based on two different primary/secondary pairs. The intersections of the two sets of curves normally result in two possible locations. Using some other form of navigation, dead reckoning for instance, one of these possible positions can be eliminated, thus providing an exact fix.

=== LORAN stations ===
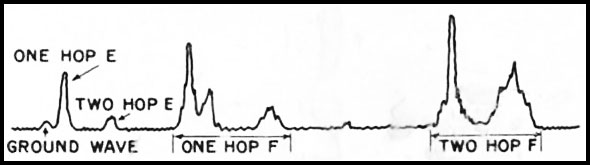
The signal from a single LORAN transmitter will be received several times from several directions. This image shows the weak groundwave arriving first, then signals after one and two hops off the ionosphere's E layer, and finally one and two hops off the F layer. Operator skill was needed to tell these apart.

LORAN stations were built in chains, one primary and two secondaries (minimally, some chains were constituted of as many as five stations) typically separated by about 600 miles (970 km). Each pair broadcast on one of four frequencies, 1.75, 1.85, 1.9 or 1.95 MHz, as well as the unused 7.5 MHz. (Note: Four frequencies are listed in the Navy documentation, but almost all sources refer to only three. The missing member appears to be 1.75 MHz.) In any given location it was common to be able to receive more than three stations at a time, so some other means of identifying the pairs was needed. LORAN adopted the use of varying the pulse-repetition frequency (PRF) for this task, with each station sending out a string of 40 pulses at either 33.3 or 25 pulses per second.

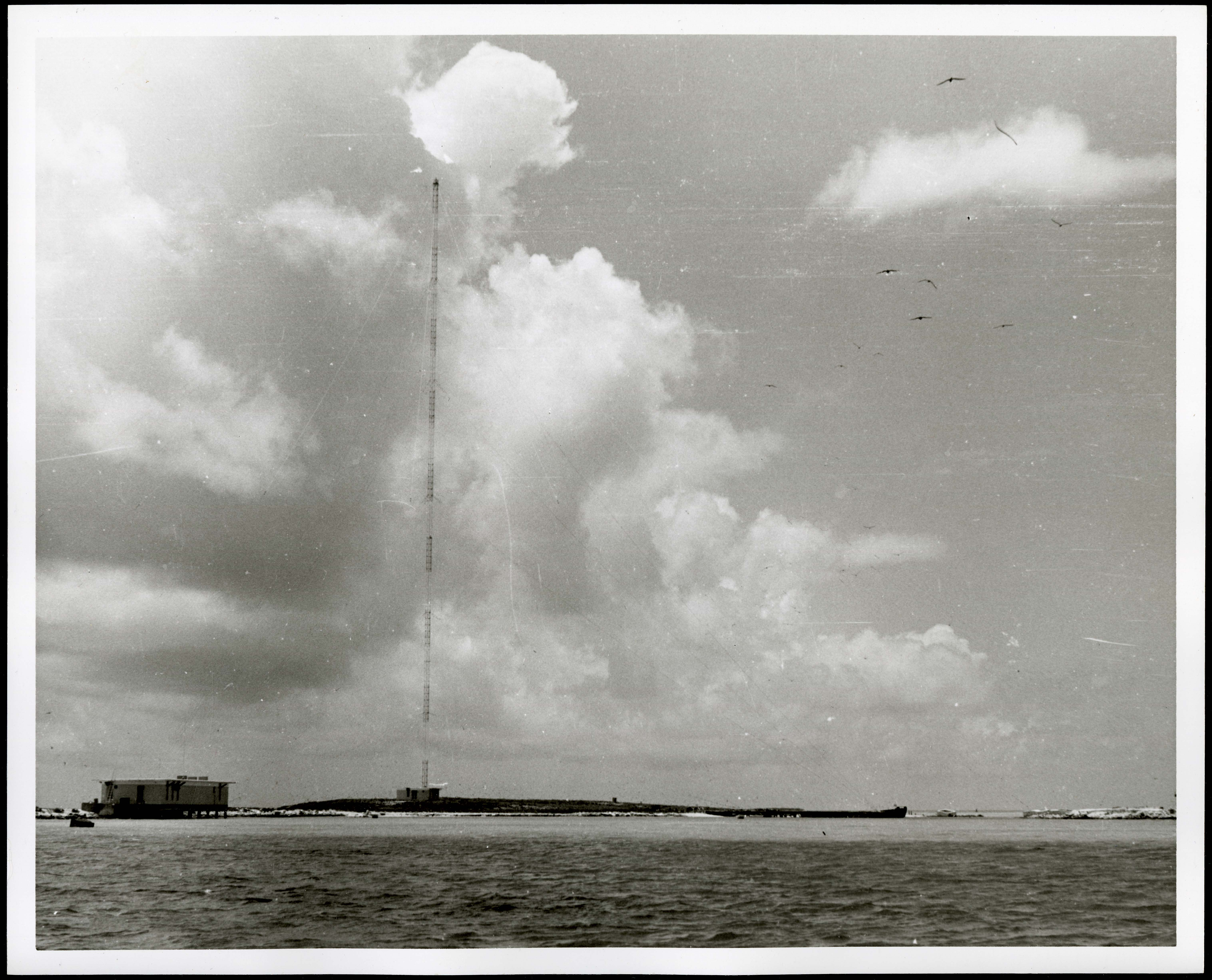
LORAN tower station on Sand Island in Johnston Atoll, 1963

Stations were identified with a simple code — a number indicating the frequency band, a letter for the pulse repetition frequency, and a number for the station within the chain. For instance, the three stations on the Hawaiian Islands were arranged as two pairs 2L 0 and 2L 1. This indicated that they were on channel 2 (1.85 MHz), used the "L"ow repetition rate (25 Hz), and that two of the stations were on the base repetition rate, while the other two (primary and the third station) used repetition rate 1. The PRF could be adjusted from 25 to 25 and 7/16th for Low, and 33 1/3 to 34 1/9th for High. This system shared the middle tower, which broadcast on both frequencies.

In the case of Gee, signals were direct from the transmitter to receiver, producing a clean signal that was easy to interpret. If displayed on a single CRT trace, the operator would see a string of sharp "blips", first the primary, then one of the secondaries, the primary again, and then the other secondary. Gee CRTs were built to be able to display two traces, and by tuning several delay circuits, the operator could make the first primary-secondary signal appear on the upper display and the second on the lower. They could then take a measurement of both delays at the same time.

In comparison, LORAN was deliberately designed to allow skywaves to be used, and the resulting received signal was far more complex. The groundwave remained fairly sharp, but could be received only at shorter distances and was primarily used during the day. At night, as many as thirty different skywaves might be received from a single transmitter, often overlapped in time, creating a complex return pattern. Since the pattern depended on the atmospherics between the transmitter and receiver, the received pattern was different for the two stations. One might receive a two-bounce skywave from one station at the same time as a three-bounce wave from another, making interpretation of the display quite difficult.

Although LORAN deliberately used the same display as Gee in order to share equipment, the signals were so much longer and more complex than Gee that direct measurement of the two signals was simply not possible. Even the initial signal from the primary station was spread out in time with the initial groundwave signal being sharp (if received), while the skywave receptions could appear anywhere on the display. Accordingly, the LORAN operator set the delays so the primary signal appeared on one trace and the secondary on the second, allowing the complex patterns to be compared. This meant that only one primary/secondary measurement could be made at once; to produce a "fix", the entire measurement procedure had to be repeated a second time using a different set of stations. Measurement times on the order of three to five minutes were typical, requiring the navigator to take into account the motion of the vehicle during this time.

=== Measurement ===
The original airborne receiver unit was AN/APN-4 unit of 1943. It was physically identical to the UK's two-piece Gee set, and could be easily interchanged with these units. The main unit with the display also housed most of the controls. General operation started by selecting one of nine stations, labeled 0 to 8, and setting the sweep speed to 1, the lowest setting. The operator would then use the intensity and focus controls to fine tune the signal and provide a sharp display.

At the lowest sweep speed, the system also produced a local signal that was fed into the display and produced a sharply defined "pedestal", a rectangular shape displayed along the two traces. (Note: British nomenclature used "cursor" instead of "pedestal".) The amplified signal from the stations would also appear on the display, highly compressed in time so that it displayed as a series of sharp spikes (blips). As the signal was repeating, these spikes appeared many times across the width of the display. Because the display was set to sweep at the pulse repetition rate of the selected station pair, other stations in the area, at different repetition rates, would move across the display while the selected one would remain stationary.

Using the "left-right" switch, the operator would move the upper pedestal until one of the signal spikes was centred within it, and then moved the pedestal on the lower trace to center a second signal using coarse and fine delay controls. Once this was done, the system was set to sweep speed 2, which sped up the traces so that the section outlined by the pedestals filled the entire trace. This process was repeated at sweep speed 3, at which point only a selected part of the signal was visible on the screen. Turning to sweep speed 4 did not change the timing, but instead superimposed the signals on a single trace so final tuning could take place, using the gain and amplifier balance controls. The goal was to perfectly align the two traces.

At that point, measurement starts. The operator switches to sweep speed 5, which returns to a display with two separated traces, with the signals inverted and running at a lower sweep speed so that multiple repetitions of the signal appear on the traces. Mixed into the signal is an electronic scale produced in a time base generator, causing a series of small pips to appear over the now-inverted original signals. At setting 5, the pips on the scale represent differences of 10 microseconds, and the operator measures the distance between positions. This is repeated for setting 6 at 50 microseconds, and again at setting 7 at 500 microseconds. The difference as measured at each of these settings is then added up to produce the total delay between the two signals. This entire procedure was then repeated for a second primary-secondary set, often the second set of the same chain but not always.

Receiver units improved greatly over time. The AN/APN-4 was quickly supplanted by the AN/APN-9 of 1945, an all-in-one unit combining the receiver and display of greatly reduced weight.

=== Range and accuracy ===
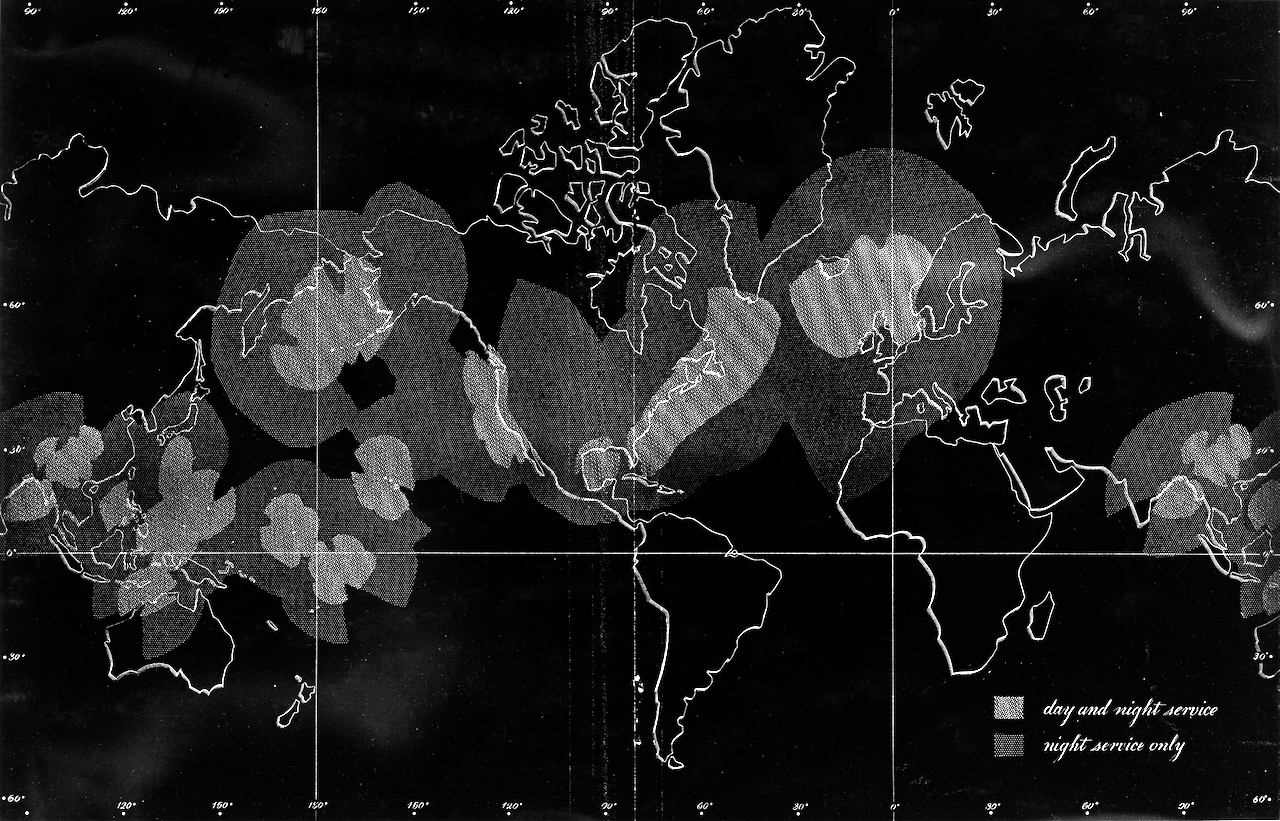
Chart depicting day and night LORAN coverage in 1946

During the day the ionosphere only weakly reflects shortwave signals, and LORAN was usable at 500–700 nautical miles (930–1,300 km) using the groundwaves. At night these signals were suppressed and the range dropped to 350–500 nautical miles (650–930 km). At night the skywaves became useful for measurements, which extended the effective range to 1,200–1,400 nautical miles (2,200–2,600 km).

At long ranges the hyperbolic lines approximate straight lines radiating from the center of the baseline. When two such signals from a single chain are considered, the resulting pattern of lines becomes increasingly parallel as the baseline distance becomes smaller in comparison to the range. Thus at short distances the lines cross at angles close to 90 degrees, and this angle steadily reduces with range. Because the accuracy of the fix depends on the crossing angle, all hyperbolic navigation systems grow increasingly inaccurate with increasing range.

Moreover, the complex series of received signals considerably confused the reading of the LORAN signal, requiring some interpretation. Accuracy was more a matter of signal quality and operator experience than any fundamental limit of the equipment or signals. The only way to express the accuracy was to measure it in practice; average accuracy on the route from Japan to Tinian, a distance of 1,400 miles (2,300 km), was 28 miles (45 km), 2% of range.

=== AT and Mobile LORAN ===
AT LORAN, for "Air Transportable", was a lightweight LORAN transmitter set that could be rapidly set up as the front moved. Operations were identical to "normal" LORAN, but it was often assumed charts would not be available and would have to be prepared in the field. Mobile LORAN was another lightweight system, mounted on trucks.
