= Sonne (navigation) =

Radio navigation system

Sonne (German for "sun") was a radio navigation system developed in Germany during World War II. It was developed from an earlier experimental system known as Elektra, and therefore the system is also known as Elektra-sonnen. When the British learned of the system they started using it as well, under the name Consol, meaning "by the sun".

Elektra was an updated version of the beam-based low-frequency radio range (LFR) used in the United States during the 1930s. This was further modified to create Sonne by electronically rotating the signal to create a series of beams sweeping across the sky. Using simple timing of the signal, the navigator could determine the angle to the station. Two such measurements then provided a radio fix. Accuracy and range were excellent, with fixes around ¼ of a degree being possible at 1,000 miles (1,600 km) range.

Sonne was so useful that it found widespread use by UK forces as well, and they took over operation after the war. The system was used for long-range navigation under the Consol name, and supported by ICAO as one of the suggested long-range air navigation systems. New stations were constructed around the world over the next twenty years. The system remained in partial use into the 1990s, with the last transmitter in Norway turned off in 1991.

== Background ==
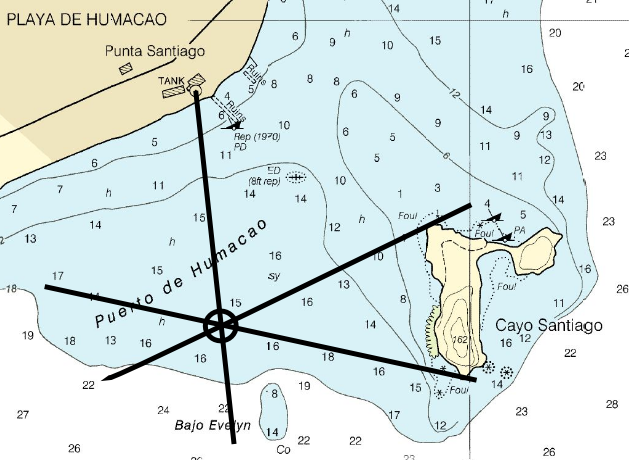
The bearing-bearing method of taking a fix using a nautical chart. In this case the navigator has taken three measurements, one against a prominent fuel tank on the shore, and two others against either side of a small island. The use of a third measure allows the position to be more accurately determined, but is not necessary.

In navigation, the determination of a "fix" requires two measurements to be taken. Using classical methods, this was normally the measurement of two angles, or bearings, along the line-of-sight to prominent landmarks, like a lighthouse. After taking the two measurements, lines of position are drawn radiating from the landmarks along the reverse angle. The lines will cross at some point, and their intersection determines the location of the navigator. In practice, a third measurement is often used, resulting in three lines that do not perfectly intersect; the size of the resulting triangle intersection area gives a rough indication of the accuracy of the measurement as a whole.

== RDF ==
The introduction of portable radio systems in the early 20th century gave rise to the possibility of using radio broadcasters (beacons) as a landmark that would be visible to a radio receiver at very great ranges, hundreds of miles or more. The angle between the navigator and the beacon can be measured by using a simple mechanism known as a loop antenna. As the antenna is rotated around a vertical axis, the strength of the received signal varies, and drops to zero (the null) when the loop is perpendicular to the line to the beacon.

This technique, known as radio direction finding (RDF), is useful but only moderately accurate. Measurements better than a few degrees are difficult with a small loop antenna, and because of the electrical characteristics, it is not always easy to make a larger version that might provide more accuracy. Moreover, the addition of a loop antenna may not be possible on smaller vehicles, or difficult to operate for those without a dedicated navigator.

There were some experiments with a sort of "reversed" version of the RDF concept. Among these was the British Orfordness Beacon which broadcast a signal from a loop that was continually rotating at 1 rpm (6 degrees a second). Every time the loop passed north it would briefly transmit the Morse code signal for the letter "V". Users would listen for the V signal and then begin a stopwatch, waiting for the signal to disappear as the loop rotated past them. The elapsed time, times six, indicated their bearing angle from the station. A second bearing to a similar station at RAE Farnborough provided a fix.

Unfortunately, in practice it was found that the system was only accurate during the day and in good weather, which limited its usefulness for its intended role of naval guidance, and the system was operational only for a brief period.

== Radio Range, Lorenz and Elektra ==
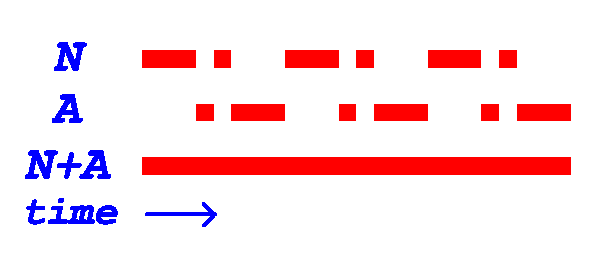
LFR audio signals: N stream, A stream and combined uniform tone

Another solution to the radio navigation problem is to use a directional "beam" signal that can only be received in a certain area. Aircraft flying within the beam will hear the signal on a conventional radio. This presents a problem; the beam should be wide enough that an aircraft can find it, but narrow enough to be an accurate guide.

The first attempts to address this issue were made in Germany as early as 1904. O. Scheller of the Lorenz company proposed a system using four signals in an overall fan-shaped pattern. Each of the signals was modulated audibly with the Morse code signal for N (dash-dot) or A (dot-dash), so a radio tuned to the broadcast frequency would hear one of these signals. The signals deliberately overlapped slightly, so there were areas where the listener would hear both at the same time. In this case the gaps in one signal would be filled in by the other, producing a steady tone known as the "equisignal".

Several developments of this basic concept followed, but it did not become practical until World War I. By that time Germany's economy was limited and their aviation activities strictly curtailed. Practical development then moved to the United States, where it was used in modified form with two wide figure-8 shaped broadcast patterns that allowed easy capture of the signal. Instead of the short-range landing system proposed by Scheller, the US system was used to build the low-frequency radio range (LFR) system starting in 1928, offering wide-area navigation between airports.

To use the system, the aircraft would tune in the station on a conventional radio. They would then listen for the signal, and depending on whether they heard the A or N, would turn until they were flying in the middle of the beam where they heard the equisignal. The system was set up so the beam pointing to the west from one station had the opposite dot-dash pattern as the one pointing east from the next, so the pilot could tune in the stations on either end of a particular leg and hear the same signal from both. As they flew from station to station they would hear the signal from one fade and the other grow, until they passed over the station where they entered the "cone of silence".

The Lorenz beam blind-landing system

As the German economy recovered, development of the Lorenz system was picked up again in the late 1930s. Ernst Kramar was asked to develop a blind landing system more along the lines of Scheller's original concept. This emerged as a system generically known as a "Lorenz beam", which used three antennas and phasing techniques to produce highly directional signals only a few degrees wide. The transmitters were placed off the end of runways and the pilot could listen to the signals to fly down the fan-shaped signal to the runway. During World War II, even more accurate and long-range versions were used as night bombing aids; see the Battle of the Beams for details.

As the German economy improved and Luft Hansa started a wider schedule, Kramar was asked to develop a system similar to LFF for use in Europe. He named this Elektra, after the character in Richard Strauss's opera of the same name. Using Lorenz beams, Elektra allowed each signal to be narrower, so a single station could provide a number of incoming and outgoing paths, instead of just four. In this way a smaller number of stations could be used in order to produce a series of airways that more directly connected airports. However, no deployment effort had taken place by the time the war started.

== Sonne ==
Early in the war the Luftwaffe approached Kramar to see if Elektra could be adapted to allow general navigation, rather than beam-flying. He responded by combining the beam concept from the Lorenz system with the rotating signal from the Orfordness concept, but in a unique system that represented a dramatic advance in form.

Instead of rotating a loop antenna, Sonne used three separate fixed antennas, spread along a line with each antenna 1 km from the next, a distance of three wavelengths at the 300 kHz operational frequency (several frequencies were used between 250–350 kHz). A single transmitter produced a signal that was sent directly to the centre antenna.

The signal was also split off from the main feed and sent to a "keying unit". This further split the signal into one of two paths, each connected to one of the two side antennas. The keying unit sent the signal briefly to one antenna and then for a longer duration to the second, producing the dot-dash pattern used in the Lorenz systems. As the centre and one of the two side antennas were powered at any given time, the resulting radiation pattern was a cardioid.

The key to the Sonne system was a further modification of the signal before it reached the antennas. A phase shifter was used to retard the signal by 90 degrees when it was sent to one of the side antennas, or advance it 90 from the other. This created a series of spikes, or lobes, within the cardioid radiation pattern, each about 7.5 degrees wide. As the antennas were physically separated, the spikes did not precisely overlap, producing the same dots, dashes and equisignal zones of the Lorenz system.

Finally, the phase delay signal was slowly "rotated". Over a period of 30 seconds, the advanced signal was retarded by 180 degrees, and the retarded signal advanced by the same 180 degrees. This caused the entire cardioid pattern to slowly rotate, dots clockwise, dashes counterclockwise.

== Navigating with Sonne ==
This portion of a 1946 UK Consol map illustrates the basic concept of the Sonne system. Navigators would determine their rough location using any form of navigation, then tune in the Consol station and start counting the dots or dashes they heard. They would then look up this number on the chart, selecting the line that was closest to their estimated location. The green lines indicate the bearings from the new Bush Mills station in Northern Ireland, red from the Stavanger station in Norway.

Once a minute the signal to the side antennae was cut off, producing a pure tone that was broadcast omni-directionally from the centre antenna. This was keyed with a Morse code station identifier. The navigator could use this 6 second period to find the general bearing to the station using RDF. This allowed them to determine which of the lobes of the pattern they expected to be located within.

When the phase delays started up again, 2 seconds after the station identifier ended, the dot-dash keying started with it. The receiver would normally be located to one side or the other of the equisignal, so they would hear either dots or dashes - for this example lets say dots. As the pattern was rotated, the dots lobe moved away from the receiver while the dashes signal approached it. So over the 30 second period, the receiver will hear dots, then the equisignal (briefly), and then dashes. By timing the arrival of the equisignal, the navigator could determine their location within the lobe.

Recreated DF tone and dashes-first sweep

Whereas Orfordness required this delay to be timed on a clock, Sonne keyed the signal once per second, allowing the timing to be captured simply by counting the number of dots or dashes. To make this process even easier, a series of nautical charts were produced with the counts listed on them. The navigator simply looked up the number on the chart to reveal the bearing.

As the pattern rotated only 7.5 degrees over 30 seconds, and the timing was accurate only to a second, the accuracy of the system was theoretically 7.5 / 30, or ¼ of a degree. In practice, during the day at 300 nautical miles, accuracies of ±½ degree were common when the receiver was located at right angles to the station's baseline, and ±1 degree at 70 degrees to the normal. Like most medium- and long-wave systems, accuracy degraded at night due to atmospheric effects, to ±1 degree on the normal and ±2 degrees at 70 degrees.

== Deployment ==
It is a general rule in navigation that the most accurate results are measured when the two bearings are as close to 90 degrees apart as possible. As Sonne was a long-range system, it made sense to locate the stations at long distances from each other, to enlarge the area where there would be large angles between the stations.

This led to deployments starting in 1940 with two stations in Spain and one in Norway. Additional stations were added throughout the war, including examples in the Netherlands, France, Spain and Germany. A total of 18 broadcasters were eventually constructed, some referred to as Sonne and others Elektra, although the reason for this naming is not clear in modern sources.

The system was compromised by the capture of the German U-boat U-505 in 1944, leading to a complete understanding of the system in the UK. This proved so useful that Sonne was quickly adopted by RAF Coastal Command, who needed a longer-range system than Gee offered. To keep their use less obvious, all British records refer to the system as "Consol".

Coastal Command's use became so widespread that they became completely dependent on the system. Late in the war, when the Germans lost access to Spain, a lack of parts led to one of the Spanish stations going offline. Edward Fennessy arranged a supply of spare parts provided by the RAF to keep it operational.

== Postwar use ==
Sonne, now known by its UK code name Consol, was widely used in the post-war era. Compared to systems like VOR or RDF, Consol required nothing more in the navigating vessel than a conventional radio and the ability to count. This proved so attractive that new Consol stations were set up in France, Northern Ireland, and even three in the US (where it was known as Consolan) and several in the USSR. It was one of the ICAO's recommended long-range navigation systems.

Although more accurate and easier to use systems were introduced, notably LORAN-C, Consol's low cost of implementation (a radio) kept it in use as a pleasure boating system for many years. Most Consol broadcasters remained in use until the 1980s, with the Stavanger station remaining online until 1991. By this point LORAN and GPS systems were falling in cost, and these had replaced most forms of radio navigation by 2000.

=== List of Consol stations ===
- Ploneis, France 48°1′16″N 4°12′55″W, call sign TRQ later FRQ, frequency 257 kHz
- Andøya, Norway 69°8′54″N 15°53′0″E, call sign LEX, frequency 332.5 kHz
- Bjørnøya, Norway 74°29′8″N 19°2′3″E, call sign LJS, frequency 332.5 kHz
- Stavanger-Varhaug, Norway 58°37′36″N 5°37′39″E, call sign LEC, frequency 319 kHz
- Lugo-Outeiro de Rei, Galicia, Spain 43°14′53.29″N 7°28′55.28″W, call sign LG, frequency 303 then 285 kHz
- Sevilla, Spain 37°31′17.44″N 6°1′48.06″W, call sign SL, frequency 311 then 315 kHz
- Jan Mayen Island, Svalbard and Jan Mayen 70°58′25″N 8°29′43″W, call sign LMC, frequency 332.5 kHz
- Bushmills, Northern Ireland, UK 55°12′20″N 6°28′2″W, call sign MWN, frequency 263 then 266 kHz
- Miami, FL, USA 25°36′16″N 80°34′16″W, call sign MMF, frequency 190 kHz
- Nantucket, MA, USA 41°15′35″N 70°9′19″W, call sign TUK, frequency 194 kHz
- San Francisco, CA, USA 38°12′13″N 122°34′8″W, call sign SFI, frequency 192 kHz
- Kanin Nos, Russian SFSR, USSR 68°38′18″N 43°23′30″E, call sign KN, frequency 269 kHz
- Ostrov Pankrat'yeva, Russian SFSR, USSR 76°07′30″N 60°10′30″E, call sign PA, frequency 280 kHz
- Rybachi, Russian SFSR, USSR 69°45′12″N 32°55′0″E, call sign RB, frequency 363 kHz

Andøya, Bjørnøya and Jan Mayen Island shared the same frequency. They took turns broadcasting over a 4 minute cycle.

=== Proposed Consol stations never built ===
- Cape Harrison, NL, Canada
- St. John's, NL, Canada
- Nanortalik, Greenland
- Eyrarbakki, Iceland
- Santa Maria, Azores, Portugal 36°59′48″N 25°10′32″W, call sign SMA, frequency 323 kHz (repurposed homing beacon)
- Atlantic City, NJ, USA, call sign ATA, test frequency 526 kHz (built but shutdown due to frequency assignment issues)
- Cape Hatteras, NC, USA, frequency 198 kHz
- Pescadero, CA, USA, call sign PES, frequency 190 kHz (first built as a homing beacon, but was never converted to a Consol station as planned)
- Point Conception, CA, USA
