= Alpha (navigation) =

Russian system for long range radio navigation

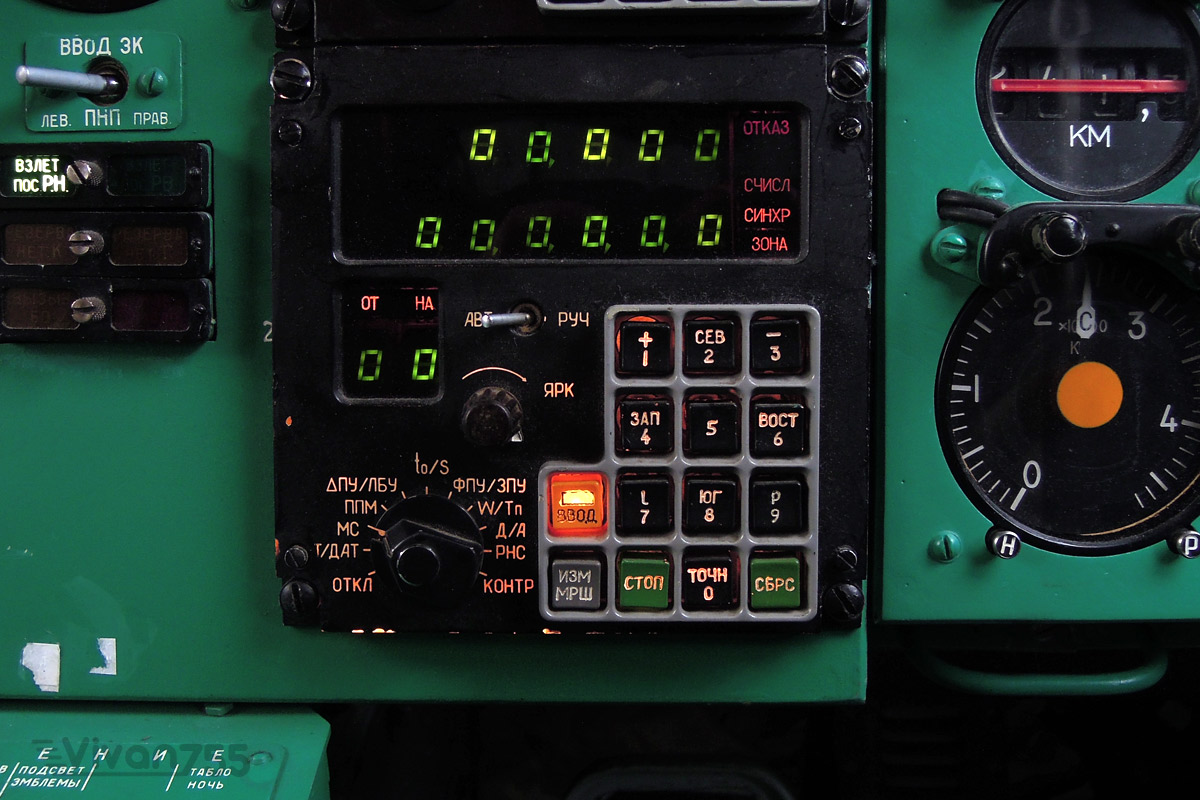
Control panel of Soviet long range navigation system RSDN-20 A-723 on Tu-154B airliner

Alpha, also known as RSDN-20, is a Russian system for long range radio navigation. RSDN in Russian stands for Радиотехническая Система Дальней Навигации (Radiotehnicheskaya Sistema Dal'ney Navigatsii), which translates to English as "radio-technical long-distance navigation system".

Alpha was used to determine positions of aircraft, ships, and submarines (in underwater positions). The system was developed in parallel with U.S. Omega navigational system, and also works in VLF-range. Alpha coverage is up to 10,000 km from the master station, with a position error of 2.5 to 7 kilometres (2 to 4 mi).

The Alpha system consists of three transmitters, placed in the proximity of Novosibirsk, Krasnodar and Khabarovsk. Two other transmitters at Revda and Seyda are not currently operational as of 2010. These transmitters radiate signals of 0.4 second duration, in a 3.6 second cycle, on the frequencies F1: 11.904761 kHz, F2: 12.648809 kHz and F3: 14.880952 kHz. A radio fix is taken by measuring the phase difference of the received signals.

Other alternative frequencies are F3p: 14.881091 kHz, F4: 12.090773 kHz, F5: 12.044270 kHz, F6: 12.500000 kHz, F7: 13.281250 kHz, F8: 15.625000 kHz, Fx: 12.700000 kHz.

Much like the antenna masts used for the U.S. Omega navigational system, the masts of Alpha must be very tall, for technical reasons. Unfortunately, no data are available for their height.

Some transmitters are being disabled as of January 2014. Several remain on the air as of November 2017.

== Transmitters ==
- Alpha transmitter Novosibirsk: (55°45′22″N 84°26′52.4″E)
- Alpha transmitter Krasnodar: (45°24′12″N 38°09′29″E)
- Alpha transmitter Khabarovsk: (50°04′24″N 136°36′24″E)
- Alpha transmitter Revda: (68°02′8″N 34°41′00″E)
- Alpha transmitter Seyda: (39°28′11.18″N 62°43′9.36″E)

== See also ==
- OMEGA, the Western counterpart of Alpha, no longer in use.
- LORAN, low frequency terrestrial radio navigation system, still in use in Europe as of 2015.
- CHAYKA, the Russian counterpart of LORAN, but still in use as of 2014.
