= Radio navigation =

Use of radio waves to determine position on Earth

Radio navigation or radionavigation is the application of radio waves to determine a position of an object on the Earth, either the vessel or an obstruction. Like radiolocation, it is a type of radiodetermination.

The basic principles are measurements from/to electric beacons, especially

- Angular directions, e.g. by bearing, radio phases or interferometry,
- Distances, e.g. ranging by measurement of time of flight between one transmitter and multiple receivers or vice versa,
- Distance differences by measurement of times of arrival of signals from one transmitter to multiple receivers or vice versa
- Partly also velocity, e.g. by means of radio Doppler shift.

Combinations of these measurement principles also are important—e.g., many radars measure range and azimuth of a target.

== Bearing-measurement systems ==
These systems used some form of directional radio antenna to determine the location of a broadcast station on the ground. Conventional navigation techniques are then used to take a radio fix. These were introduced prior to World War I, and remain in use today.

=== Radio direction finding ===
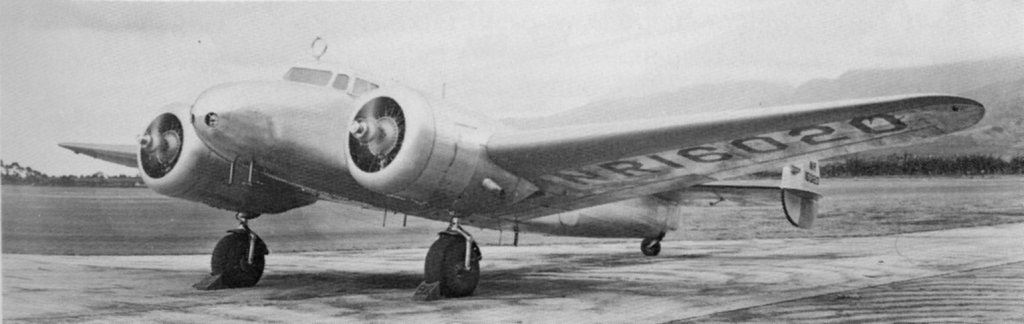
Amelia Earhart's Lockheed Electra had a prominent RDF loop on the cockpit roof.

The first system of radio navigation was the Radio Direction Finder, or RDF. By tuning in a radio station and then using a directional antenna, one could determine the direction to the broadcasting antenna. A second measurement using another station was then taken. Using triangulation, the two directions can be plotted on a map where their intersection reveals the location of the navigator. Commercial AM radio stations can be used for this task due to their long range and high power, but strings of low-power radio beacons were also set up specifically for this task, especially near airports and harbours.

Early RDF systems normally used a loop antenna, a small loop of metal wire that is mounted so it can be rotated around a vertical axis. At most angles the loop has a fairly flat reception pattern, but when it is aligned perpendicular to the station the signal received on one side of the loop cancels the signal in the other, producing a sharp drop in reception known as the "null". By rotating the loop and looking for the angle of the null, the relative bearing of the station can be determined. Loop antennas can be seen on most pre-1950s aircraft and ships.

=== Reverse RDF ===
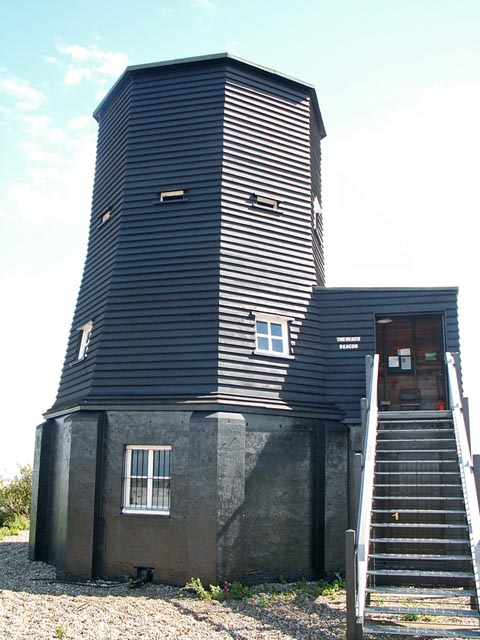
The Orfordness Beacon as it appears today.

The main problem with RDF is that it required a special antenna on the vehicle, which may not be easy to mount on smaller vehicles or single-crew aircraft. A smaller problem is that the accuracy of the system is based to a degree on the size of the antenna, but larger antennas would likewise make the installation more difficult.

During the era between World War I and World War II, a number of systems were introduced that placed the rotating antenna on the ground. As the antenna rotated through a fixed position, typically due north, the antenna was keyed with the Morse code signal of the station's identification letters so the receiver could ensure they were listening to the right station. Then they waited for the signal to either peak or disappear as the antenna briefly pointed in their direction. By timing the delay between the morse signal and the peak/null, then dividing by the known rotational rate of the station, the bearing of the station could be calculated.

The first such system was the German Telefunken Kompass Sender, which began operations in 1907 and was used operationally by the Zeppelin fleet until 1918. An improved version was introduced by the UK as the Orfordness Beacon in 1929 and used until the mid-1930s. A number of improved versions followed, replacing the mechanical motion of the antennas with phasing techniques that produced the same output pattern with no moving parts. One of the longest lasting examples was Sonne, which went into operation just before World War II and was used operationally under the name Consol until 1991. The modern VOR system is based on the same principles (see below).

=== ADF and NDB ===
A great advance in the RDF technique was introduced in the form of phase comparisons of a signal as measured on two or more small antennas, or a single highly directional solenoid. These receivers were smaller, more accurate, and simpler to operate. Combined with the introduction of the transistor and integrated circuit, RDF systems were so reduced in size and complexity that they once again became quite common during the 1960s, and were known by the new name, automatic direction finder, or ADF.

This also led to a revival in the operation of simple radio beacons for use with these RDF systems, now referred to as non-directional beacons (NDB). As the LF/MF signals used by NDBs can follow the curvature of earth, NDB has a much greater range than VOR which travels only in line of sight. NDB can be categorized as long range or short range depending on their power. The frequency band allotted to non-directional beacons is 190–1750 kHz, but the same system can be used with any common AM-band commercial station.

=== VOR ===
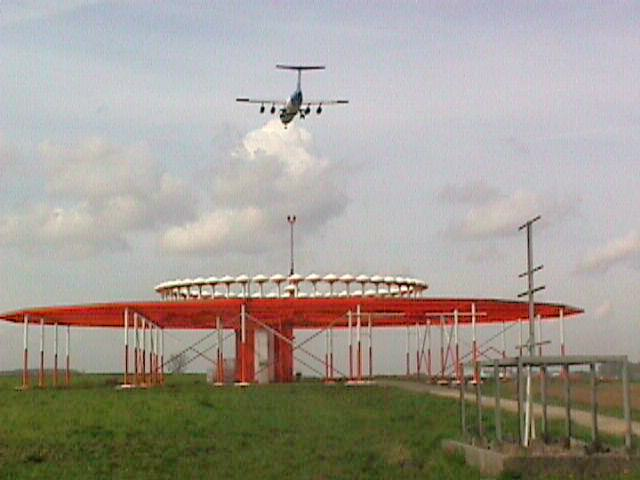
VOR transmitter station

VHF omnidirectional range, or VOR, is an implementation of the reverse-RDF system, but one that is more accurate and able to be completely automated.

The VOR station transmits two audio signals on a VHF carrier – one is Morse code at 1020 Hz to identify the station, the other is a continuous 9960 Hz audio modulated at 30 Hz, with the 0-degree referenced to magnetic north. This signal is rotated mechanically or electrically at 30 Hz, which appears as a 30 Hz AM signal added to the previous two signals, the phasing of which is dependent on the position of the aircraft relative to the VOR station.

The VOR signal is a single RF carrier that is demodulated into a composite audio signal composed of a 9960 Hz reference signal frequency modulated at 30 Hz, a 30 Hz AM reference signal, and a 1020 Hz 'marker' signal for station identification. Conversion from this audio signal into a usable navigation aid is done by a navigation converter, which takes the reference signal and compares the phasing with the variable signal. The phase difference in degrees is provided to navigational displays. Station identification is by listening to the audio directly, as the 9960 Hz and 30 Hz signals are filtered out of the aircraft internal communication system, leaving only the 1020 Hz Morse-code station identification.

The system may be used with a compatible glideslope and marker beacon receiver, making the aircraft ILS-capable (Instrument Landing System)}. Once the aircraft's approach is accurate (the aircraft is in the "right place"), the VOR receiver will be used on a different frequency to determine if the aircraft is pointed in the "right direction." Some aircraft will usually employ two VOR receiver systems, one in VOR-only mode to determine "right place" and another in ILS mode in conjunction with a glideslope receiver to determine "right direction." }The combination of both allows for a precision approach in foul weather.

== Beam systems ==
Beam systems broadcast narrow signals in the sky, and navigation is accomplished by keeping the aircraft centred in the beam. A number of stations are used to create an airway, with the navigator tuning in different stations along the direction of travel. These systems were common in the era when electronics were large and expensive, as they placed minimum requirements on the receivers – they were simply voice radio sets tuned to the selected frequencies. However, they did not provide navigation outside of the beams, and were thus less flexible in use. The rapid miniaturization of electronics during and after World War II made systems like VOR practical, and most beam systems rapidly disappeared.

=== Lorenz ===
In the post-World War I era, the Lorenz company of Germany developed a means of projecting two narrow radio signals with a slight overlap in the center. By broadcasting different audio signals in the two beams, the receiver could position themselves very accurately down the centreline by listening to the signal in their headphones. The system was accurate to less than a degree in some forms.

Originally known as "Ultrakurzwellen-Landefunkfeuer" (LFF), or simply "Leitstrahl" (guiding beam), little money was available to develop a network of stations. The first widespread radio navigation network, using Low and Medium Frequencies, was instead led by the US (see LFF, below). Development was restarted in Germany in the 1930s as a short-range system deployed at airports as a blind landing aid. Although there was some interest in deploying a medium-range system like the US LFF, deployment had not yet started when the beam system was combined with the Orfordness timing concepts to produce the highly accurate Sonne system. In all of these roles, the system was generically known simply as a "Lorenz beam". Lorenz was an early predecessor to the modern Instrument Landing System.

In the immediate pre-World War II era the same concept was also developed as a blind-bombing system. This used very large antennas to provide the required accuracy at long distances (over England), and very powerful transmitters. Two such beams were used, crossing over the target to triangulate it. Bombers would enter one of the beams and use it for guidance until they heard the second one in a second radio receiver, using that signal to time the dropping of their bombs. The system was highly accurate, and the 'Battle of the Beams' broke out when United Kingdom intelligence services attempted, and then succeeded, in rendering the system useless through electronic warfare.

=== Low-frequency radio range ===
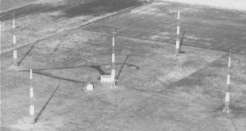
LFR ground station

In 1926 the National Bureau of Standards began developing the low-frequency radio range, or four course range system.

The ground stations consisted of a set of four antennas that projected two overlapping directional figure-eight signal patterns at a 90-degree angle to each other. One of these patterns was "keyed" with the Morse code signal "A", dit-dah, and the second pattern "N", dah-dit. This created two opposed "A" quadrants and two opposed "N" quadrants around the station. The borders between these quadrants created four course legs or "beams" and if the pilot flew down these lines, the "A" and "N" signal merged into a steady "on course" tone and the pilot was "on the beam". If the pilot deviated to either side the "A" or "N" tone would become louder and the pilot knew to make a correction. The beams were typically aligned with other stations to produce a set of airways, allowing an aircraft to travel from airport to airport by following a selected set of stations. Effective course accuracy was about three degrees, which near the station provided sufficient safety margins for instrument approaches down to low minimums. At its peak deployment, there were over 400 LFR stations in the US.

=== Glide path and the localizer of ILS ===
The remaining widely used beam systems are glide path and the localizer of the instrument landing system (ILS). ILS uses a localizer to provide horizontal position and glide path to provide vertical positioning. ILS can provide enough accuracy and redundancy to allow automated landings.

For more information see also:

== Transponder systems ==
Positions can be determined with any two measures of angle or distance. The introduction of radar in the 1930s provided a way to directly determine the distance to an object even at long distances. Navigation systems based on these concepts soon appeared, and remained in widespread use until recently. Today they are used primarily for aviation, although GPS has largely supplanted this role.

=== Radar and transponders ===
Early radar systems, like the UK's Chain Home, consisted of large transmitters and separate receivers. The transmitter periodically sends out a short pulse of a powerful radio signal, which is sent into space through broadcast antennas. When the signal reflects off a target, some of that signal is reflected back in the direction of the station, where it is received. The received signal is a tiny fraction of the broadcast power, and has to be powerfully amplified in order to be used.

The same signals are also sent over local electrical wiring to the operator's station, which is equipped with an oscilloscope. Electronics attached to the oscilloscope provides a signal that increases in voltage over a short period of time, a few microseconds. When sent to the X input of the oscilloscope, this causes a horizontal line to be displayed on the scope. This "sweep" is triggered by a signal tapped off the broadcaster, so the sweep begins when the pulse is sent. Amplified signals from the receiver are then sent to the Y input, where any received reflection causes the beam to move upward on the display. This causes a series of "blips" to appear along the horizontal axis, indicating reflected signals. By measuring the distance from the start of the sweep to the blip, which corresponds to the time between broadcast and reception, the distance to the object can be determined.

Soon after the introduction of radar, the radio transponder appeared. Transponders are a combination of receiver and transmitter whose operation is automated – upon reception of a particular signal, normally a pulse on a particular frequency, the transponder sends out a pulse in response, typically delayed by some very short time. Transponders were initially used as the basis for early IFF systems; aircraft with the proper transponder would appear on the display as part of the normal radar operation, but then the signal from the transponder would cause a second blip to appear a short time later. Single blips were enemies, double blips friendly.

Transponder-based distance-distance navigation systems have a significant advantage in terms of positional accuracy. Any radio signal spreads out over distance, forming the fan-like beams of the Lorenz signal, for instance. As the distance between the broadcaster and receiver grows, the area covered by the fan increases, decreasing the accuracy of location within it. In comparison, transponder-based systems measure the timing between two signals, and the accuracy of that measure is largely a function of the equipment and nothing else. This allows these systems to remain accurate over very long range.

The latest transponder systems (mode S) can also provide position information, possibly derived from GNSS, allowing for even more precise positioning of targets.

=== Bombing systems ===
The first distance-based navigation system was the German Y-Gerät blind-bombing system. This used a Lorenz beam for horizontal positioning, and a transponder for ranging. A ground-based system periodically sent out pulses which the airborne transponder returned. By measuring the total round-trip time on a radar's oscilloscope, the aircraft's range could be accurately determined even at very long ranges. An operator then relayed this information to the bomber crew over voice channels, and indicated when to drop the bombs.

The British introduced similar systems, notably the Oboe system. This used two stations in England that operated on different frequencies and allowed the aircraft to be triangulated in space. To ease pilot workload only one of these was used for navigation – prior to the mission a circle was drawn over the target from one of the stations, and the aircraft was directed to fly along this circle on instructions from the ground operator. The second station was used, as in Y-Gerät, to time the bomb drop. Unlike Y-Gerät, Oboe was deliberately built to offer very high accuracy, as good as 35 m, much better than even the best optical bombsights.

One problem with Oboe was that it allowed only one aircraft to be guided at a time. This was addressed in the later Gee-H system by placing the transponder on the ground and broadcaster in the aircraft. The signals were then examined on existing Gee display units in the aircraft (see below). Gee-H did not offer the accuracy of Oboe, but could be used by as many as 90 aircraft at once. This basic concept has formed the basis of most distance measuring navigation systems to this day.

=== Beacons ===
The key to the transponder concept is that it can be used with existing radar systems. The ASV radar introduced by RAF Coastal Command was designed to track down submarines and ships by displaying the signal from two antennas side by side and allowing the operator to compare their relative strength. Adding a ground-based transponder immediately turned the same display into a system able to guide the aircraft towards a transponder, or "beacon" in this role, with high accuracy.

The British put this concept to use in their Rebecca/Eureka system, where battery-powered "Eureka" transponders were triggered by airborne "Rebecca" radios and then displayed on ASV Mk. II radar sets. Eureka's were provided to French resistance fighters, who used them to call in supply drops with high accuracy. The US quickly adopted the system for paratroop operations, dropping the Eureka with pathfinder forces or partisans, and then homing in on those signals to mark the drop zones.

The beacon system was widely used in the post-war era for blind bombing systems. Of particular note were systems used by the US Marines that allowed the signal to be delayed in such a way to offset the drop point. These systems allowed the troops at the front line to direct the aircraft to points in front of them, directing fire on the enemy. Beacons were widely used for temporary or mobile navigation as well, as the transponder systems were generally small and low-powered, able to be man portable or mounted on a Jeep.

=== DME ===
In the post-war era, a general navigation system using transponder-based systems was deployed as the distance measuring equipment (DME) system.

DME was identical to Gee-H in concept, but used new electronics to automatically measure the time delay and display it as a number, rather than having the operator time the signals manually on an oscilloscope. This led to the possibility that DME interrogation pulses from different aircraft might be confused, but this was solved by having each aircraft send out a different series of pulses which the ground-based transponder repeated back.

DME is almost always used in conjunction with VOR, and is normally co-located at a VOR station. This combination allows a single VOR/DME station to provide both angle and distance, and thereby provide a single-station fix. DME is also used as the distance-measuring basis for the military TACAN system, and their DME signals can be used by civilian receivers.

== Hyperbolic systems ==
Hyperbolic navigation systems are a modified form of transponder systems which eliminate the need for an airborne transponder. The name refers to the fact that they do not produce a single distance or angle, but instead indicate a location along any number of hyperbolic lines in space. Two such measurements produces a fix. As these systems are almost always used with a specific navigational chart with the hyperbolic lines plotted on it, they generally reveal the receiver's location directly, eliminating the need for manual triangulation. As these charts were digitized, they became the first true location-indication navigational systems, outputting the location of the receiver as latitude and longitude. Hyperbolic systems were introduced during World War II and remained the main long-range advanced navigation systems until GPS replaced them in the 1990s.

=== Gee ===
The first hyperbolic system to be developed was the British Gee system, developed during World War II. Gee used a series of transmitters sending out precisely timed signals, with the signals leaving the stations at fixed delays. An aircraft using Gee, RAF Bomber Command's heavy bombers, examined the time of arrival on an oscilloscope at the navigator's station. If the signal from two stations arrived at the same time, the aircraft must be an equal distance from both transmitters, allowing the navigator to determine a line of position on his chart of all the positions at that distance from both stations. More typically, the signal from one station would be received earlier than the other. The difference in timing between the two signals would reveal them to be along a curve of possible locations. By making similar measurements with other stations, additional lines of position can be produced, leading to a fix. Gee was accurate to about 165 yards (150 m) at short ranges, and up to a mile (1.6 km) at longer ranges over Germany. Gee remained in use long after World War II, and equipped RAF aircraft as late as the 1960s (approx freq was by then 68 MHz).

=== LORAN ===
With Gee entering operation in 1942, similar US efforts were seen to be superfluous. They turned their development efforts towards a much longer-ranged system based on the same principles, using much lower frequencies that allowed coverage across the Atlantic Ocean. The result was LORAN, for "LOng-range Aid to Navigation". The downside to the long-wavelength approach was that accuracy was greatly reduced compared to the high-frequency Gee. LORAN was widely used during convoy operations in the late war period.

=== Decca ===
Another British system from the same era was Decca Navigator. This differed from Gee primarily in that the signals were not pulses delayed in time, but continuous signals delayed in phase. By comparing the phase of the two signals, the time difference information as Gee was returned. However, this was far easier to display; the system could output the phase angle to a pointer on a dial removing any need for visual interpretation. As the circuitry for driving this display was quite small, Decca systems normally used three such displays, allowing quick and accurate reading of multiple fixes. Decca found its greatest use post-war on ships, and remained in use into the 1990s.

=== LORAN-C ===
Almost immediately after the introduction of LORAN, in 1952 work started on a greatly improved version. LORAN-C (the original retroactively became LORAN-A) combined the techniques of pulse timing in Gee with the phase comparison of Decca.

The resulting system (operating in the low frequency (LF) radio spectrum from 90 to 110 kHz) that was both long-ranged (for 60 kW stations, up to 3400 miles) and accurate. To do this, LORAN-C sent a pulsed signal, but modulated the pulses with an AM signal within it. Gross positioning was determined using the same methods as Gee, locating the receiver within a wide area. Finer accuracy was then provided by measuring the phase difference of the signals, overlaying that second measure on the first. By 1962, high-power LORAN-C was in place in at least 15 countries.

LORAN-C was fairly complex to use, requiring a room of equipment to pull out the different signals. However, with the introduction of integrated circuits, this was quickly reduced further and further. By the late 1970s, LORAN-C units were the size of a stereo amplifier and were commonly found on almost all commercial ships as well as some larger aircraft. By the 1980s, this had been further reduced to the size of a conventional radio, and it became common even on pleasure boats and personal aircraft. It was the most popular navigation system in use through the 1980s and 90s, and its popularity led to many older systems being shut down, like Gee and Decca. However, like the beam systems before it, civilian use of LORAN-C was short-lived when GPS technology drove it from the market.

=== Other hyperbolic systems ===
Similar hyperbolic systems included the US global-wide VLF/Omega Navigation System, and the similar Alpha deployed by the USSR. These systems determined pulse timing not by comparison of two signals, but by comparison of a single signal with a local atomic clock. The expensive-to-maintain Omega system was shut down in 1997 as the US military migrated to using GPS. Alpha is still in use.

== Satellite navigation ==
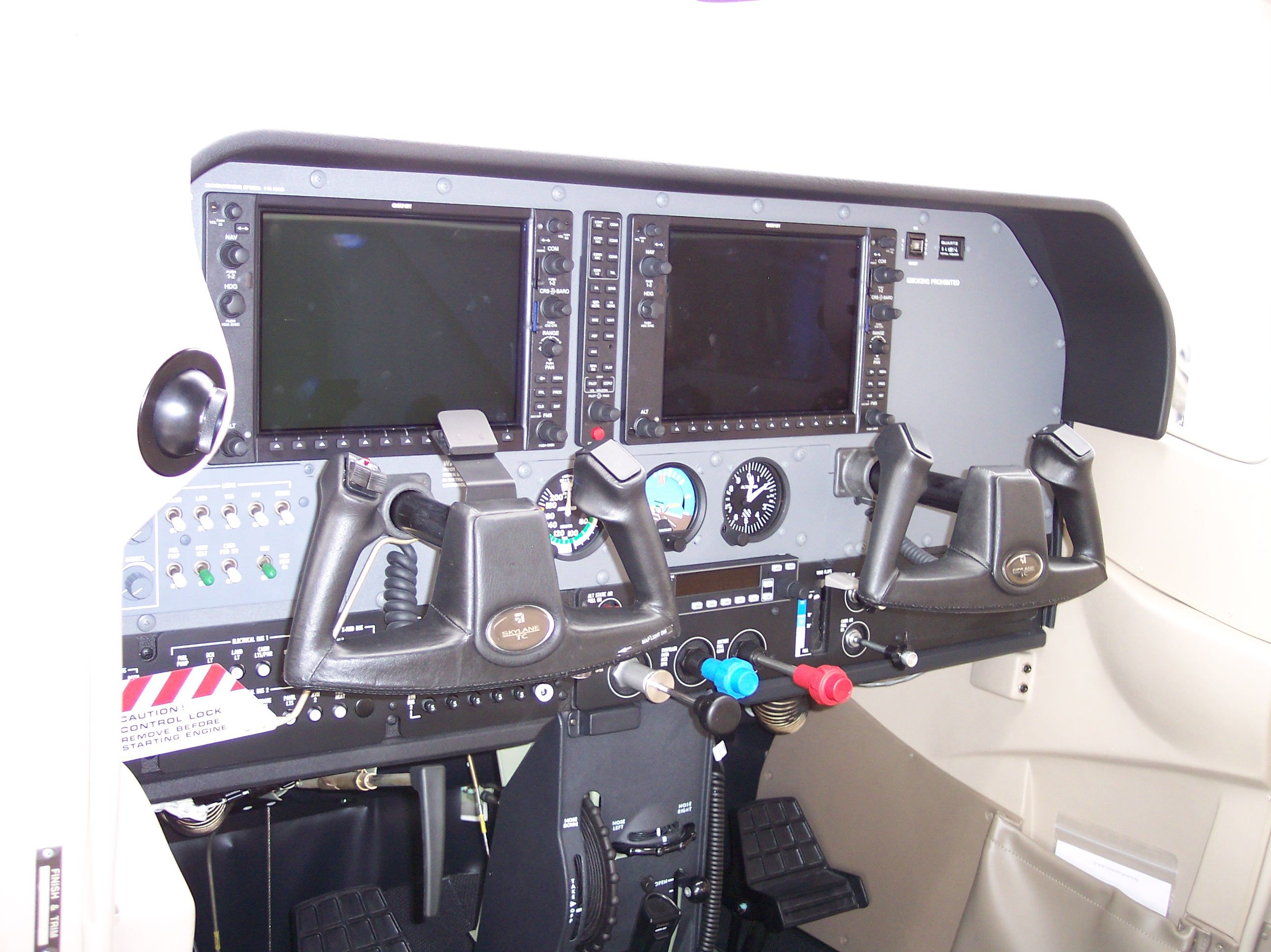
Cessna 182 with GPS-based "glass cockpit" avionics

Since the 1960s, navigation has increasingly moved to satellite navigation systems. These are essentially hyperbolic systems whose transmitters are in orbits. That the satellites move with respect to the receiver requires that the calculation of the positions of the satellites must be taken into account, which can only be handled effectively with a computer.

Satellite navigation systems send several signals that are used to decode the satellite's position, distance between the user satellite, and the user's precise time. One signal encodes the satellite's ephemeris data, which is used to accurately calculate the satellite's location at any time. Space weather and other effects causes the orbit to change over time so the ephemeris has to be updated periodically. Other signals send out the time as measured by the satellite's onboard atomic clock. By measuring signal times of arrival (TOAs) from at least four satellites, the user's receiver can re-build an accurate clock signal of its own and allows hyperbolic navigation to be carried out.

Satellite navigation systems offer better accuracy than any land-based system, are available at almost all locations on the Earth, can be implemented (receiver-side) at modest cost and complexity, with modern electronics, and require only a few dozen satellites to provide worldwide coverage. As a result of these advantages, satellite navigation has led to almost all previous systems falling from use. LORAN, Omega, Decca, Consol and many other systems disappeared during the 1990s and 2000s. The only other systems still in use are aviation aids, which are also being turned off for long-range navigation while new differential GPS systems are being deployed to provide the local accuracy needed for blind landings.

== International regulation ==
Radionavigation service (short: RNS) is – according to Article 1.42 of the International Telecommunication Union's (ITU) Radio Regulations (RR) – defined as "A radiodetermination service for the purpose of radionavigation, including obstruction warning."

This service is a so-called safety-of-life service, must be protected for Interferences, and is essential part of Navigation.

This radiocommunication service is classified in accordance with ITU Radio Regulations (article 1) as follows:
Radiodetermination service (article 1.40)

- Radiodetermination-satellite service (article 1.41)
- Radionavigation service (article 1.42)
  - Radionavigation-satellite service (article 1.43)
  - Maritime radionavigation service (article 1.44)
    - Maritime radionavigation-satellite service (article 1.45)
  - Aeronautical radionavigation service (article 1.46)
    - Aeronautical radionavigation-satellite service (article 1.47)

=== Aeronautical ===
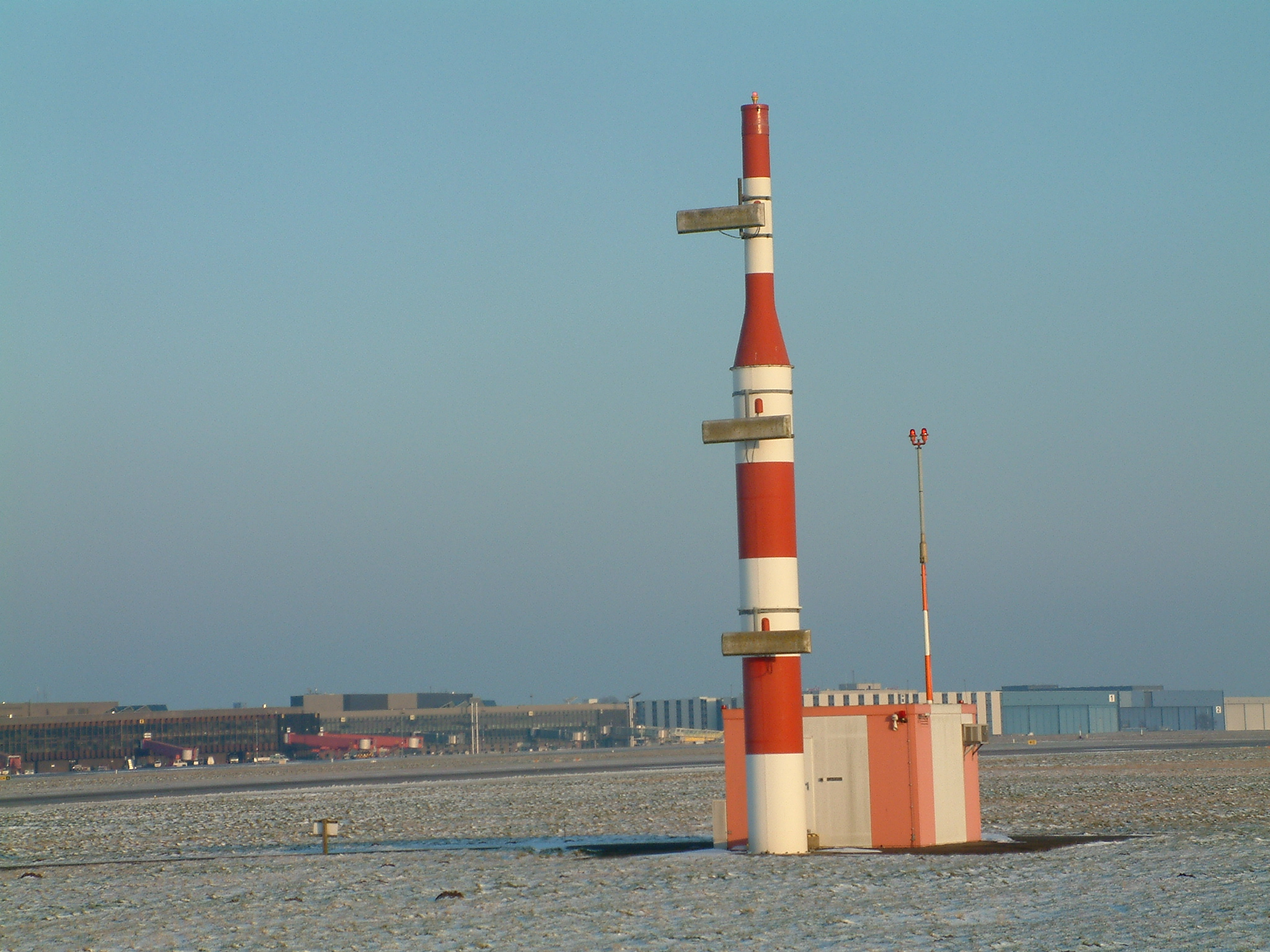
ILS-antenna on Hannover Airport

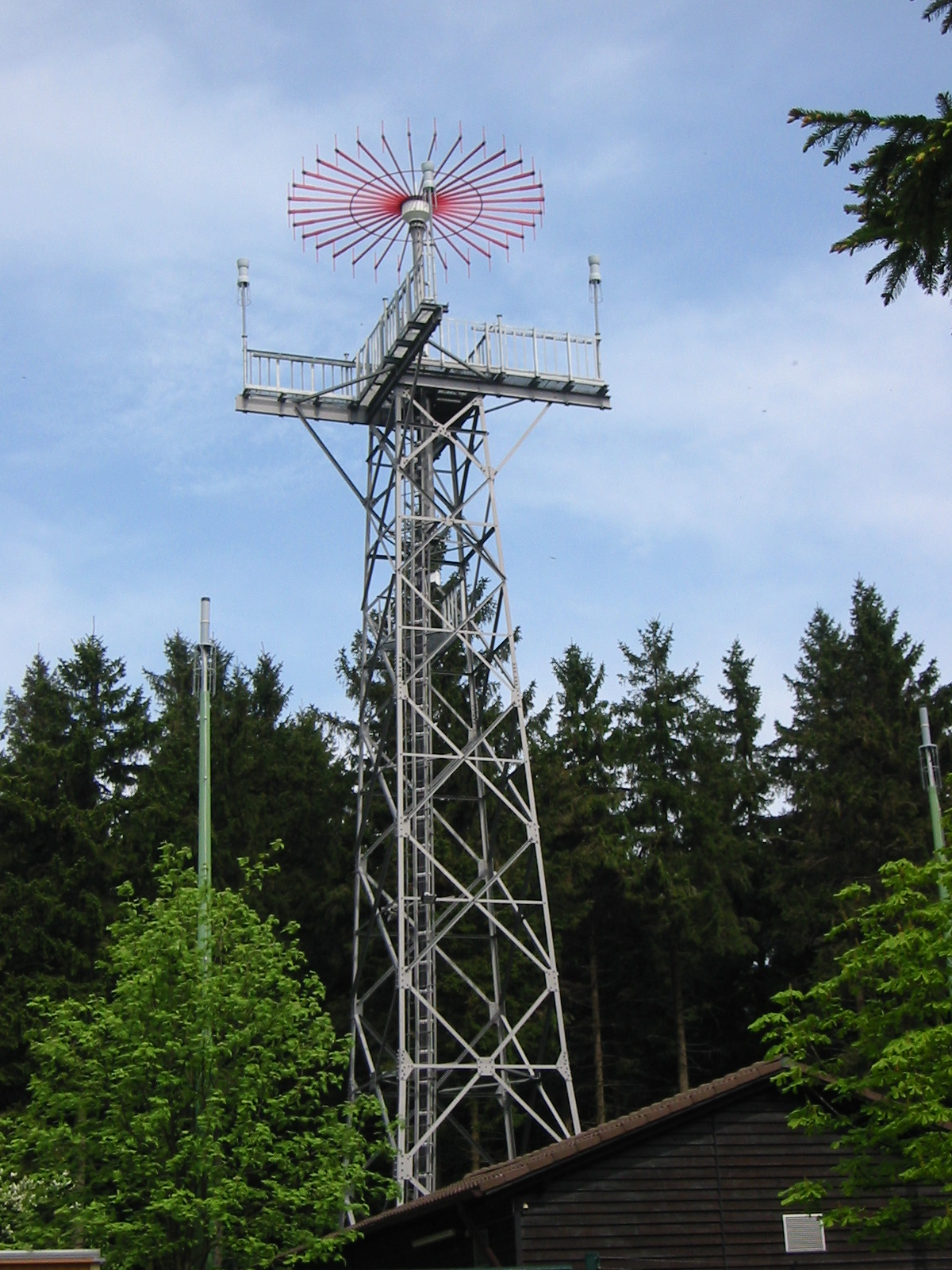
VHF direction finder antenna of the ARNS on Deister nearby Hanover

Aeronautical radionavigation service (short: ARNS) is – according to Article 1.46 of the International Telecommunication Union's (ITU) Radio Regulations (RR) – defined as "A radionavigation service intended for the benefit and for the safe operation of aircraft."

This service is a so-called safety-of-life service, must be protected against interference, and is an essential part of navigation.

=== Maritime ===
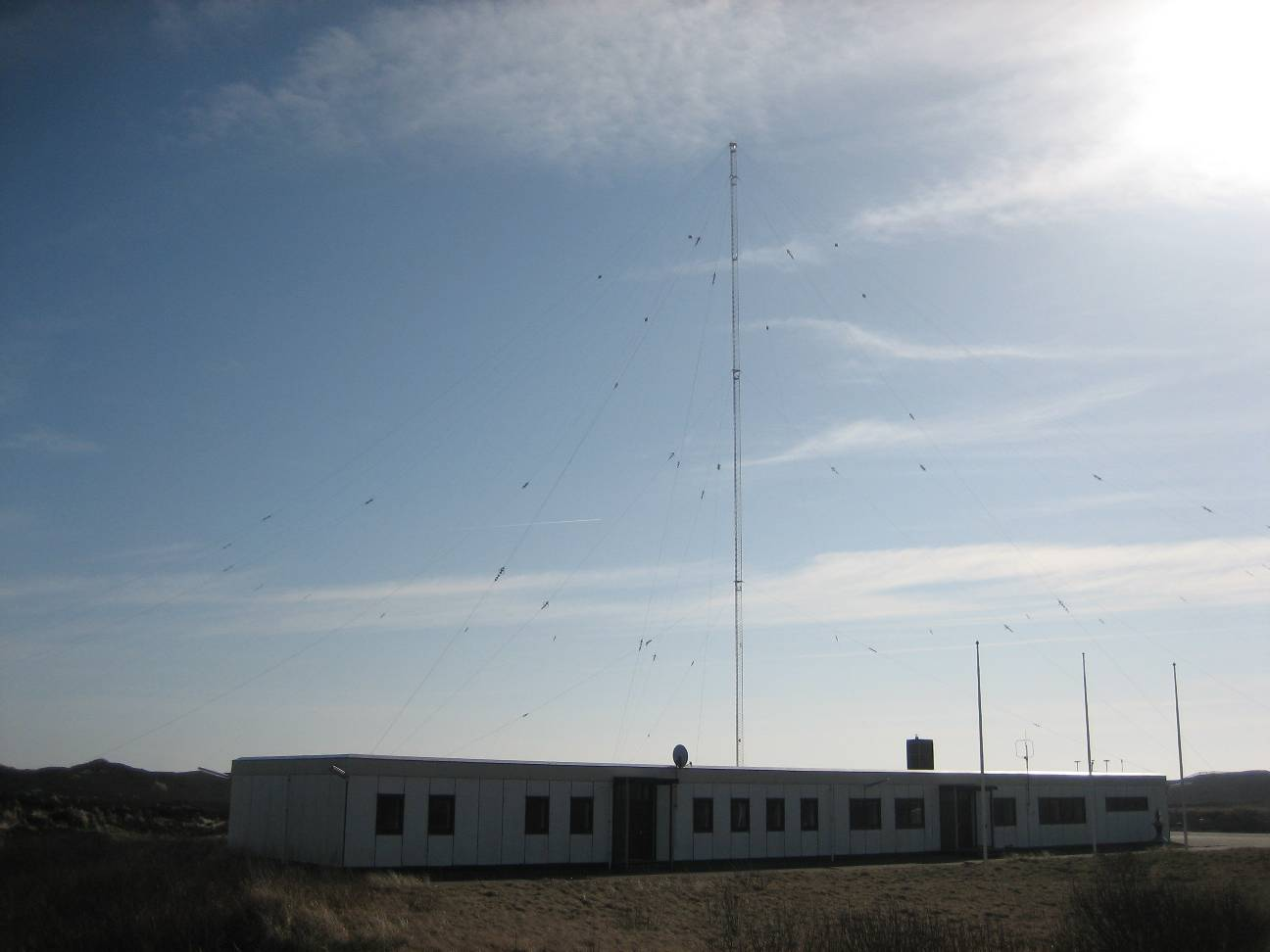
Radionavigation land station (LORAN-C-transmitter Rantum)

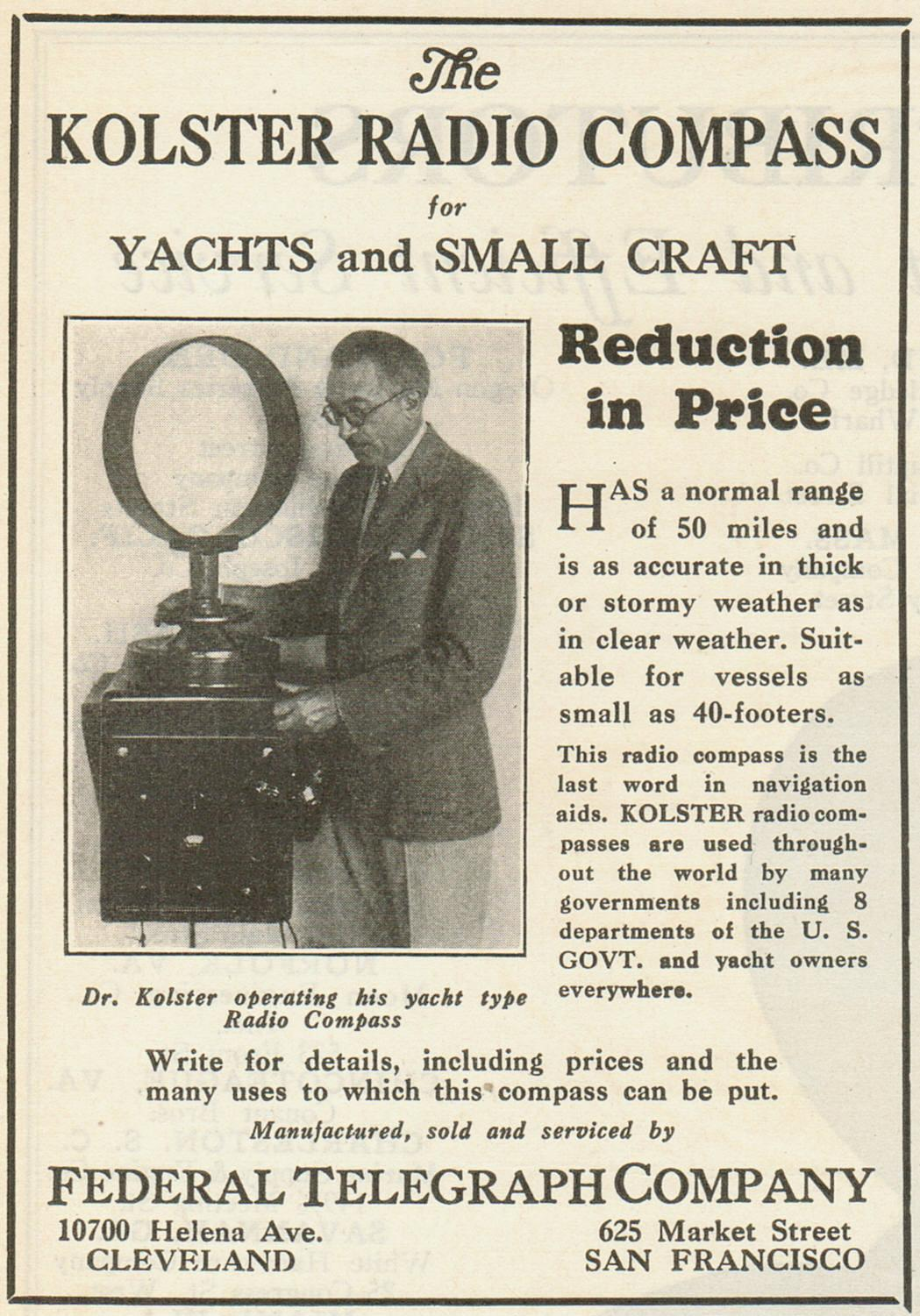
Radionavigation mobile station (RDF) 1930

Maritime radionavigation service (short: MRNS) is – according to Article 1.44 of the International Telecommunication Union's (ITU) Radio Regulations (RR) – defined as "A radionavigation service intended for the benefit and for the safe operation of ships."

This service is a so-called safety-of-life service, must be protected for interferences, and is essential part of navigation.

== Stations ==
=== Land station ===
1 DME; 2 VOR Radionavigation land stations

A radionavigation land station is – according to article 1.88 of the International Telecommunication Union's (ITU) ITU Radio Regulations (RR) – defined as "A radio station in the radionavigation service not intended to be used while in motion."

Each radio station shall be classified by the radiocommunication service in which it operates permanently or temporarily. This station operates in a safety-of-life service and must be protected for Interferences.

In accordance with ITU Radio Regulations (article 1) this type of radio station might be classified as follows:
Radiodetermination station (article 1.86) of the radiodetermination service (article 1.40 )

- Radionavigation mobile station (article 1.87) of the radionavigation service (article 1.42)
- Radionavigation land station

Selection radionavigation land stations

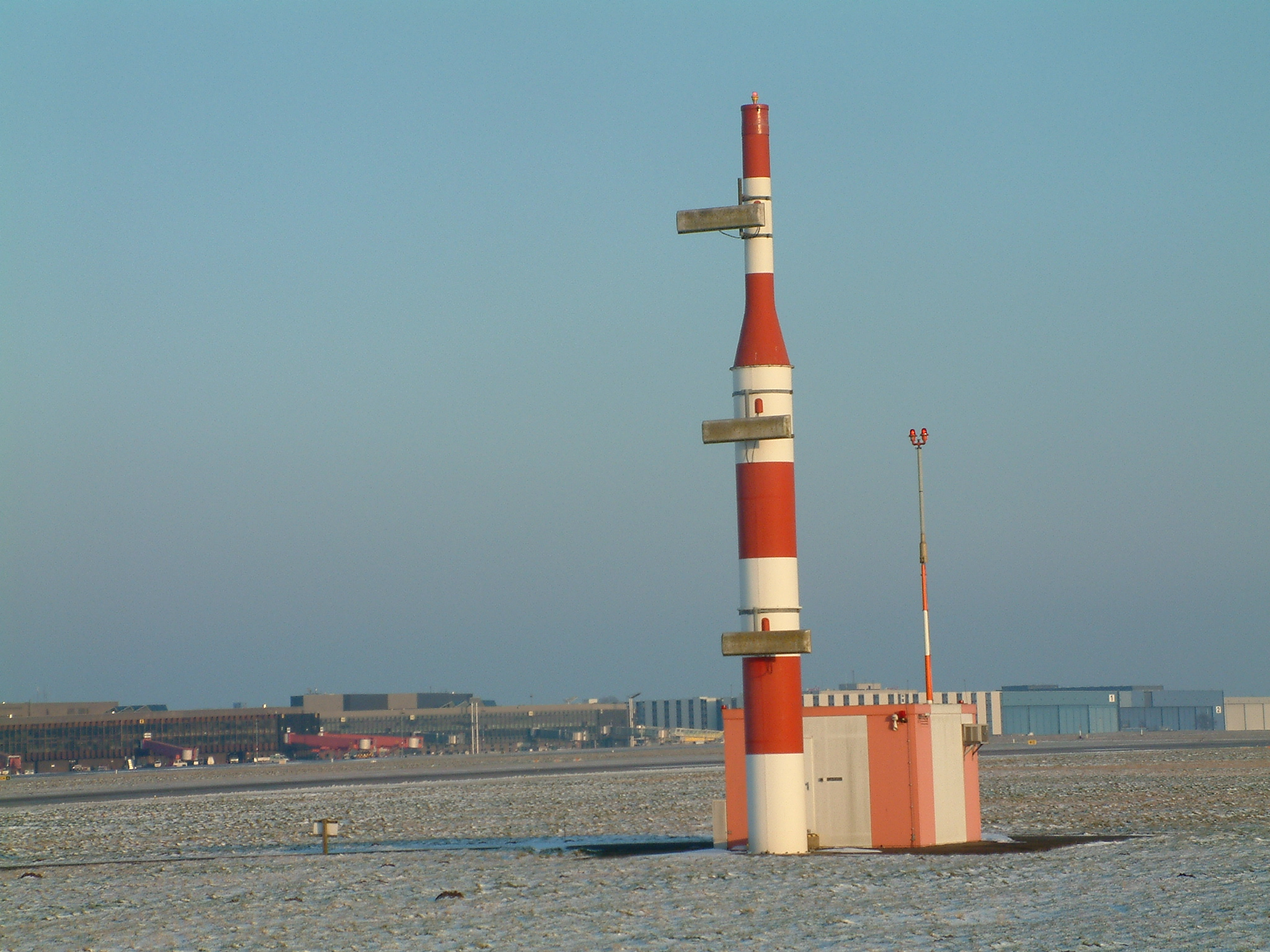
ILS glide path transmitter

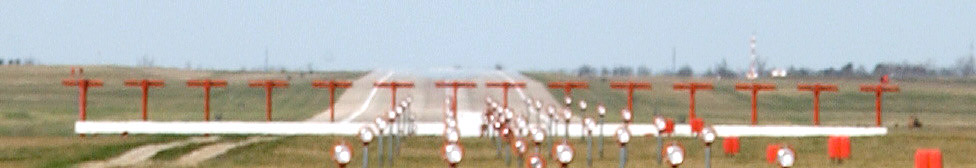
ILS Localizer

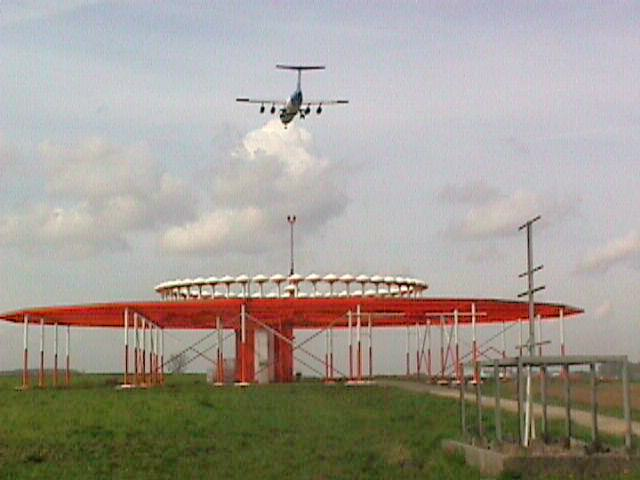
DME with VOR

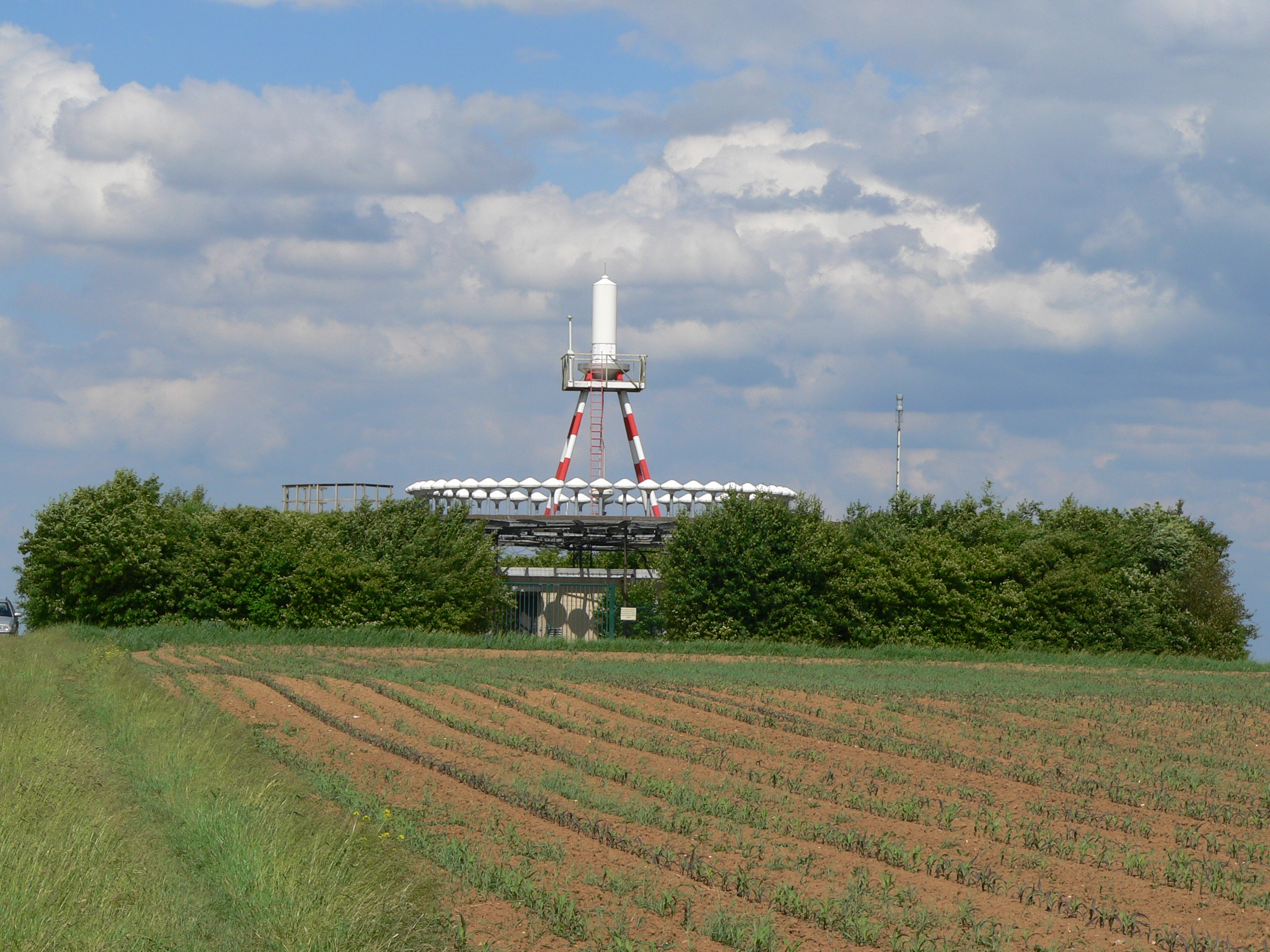
VORTAC

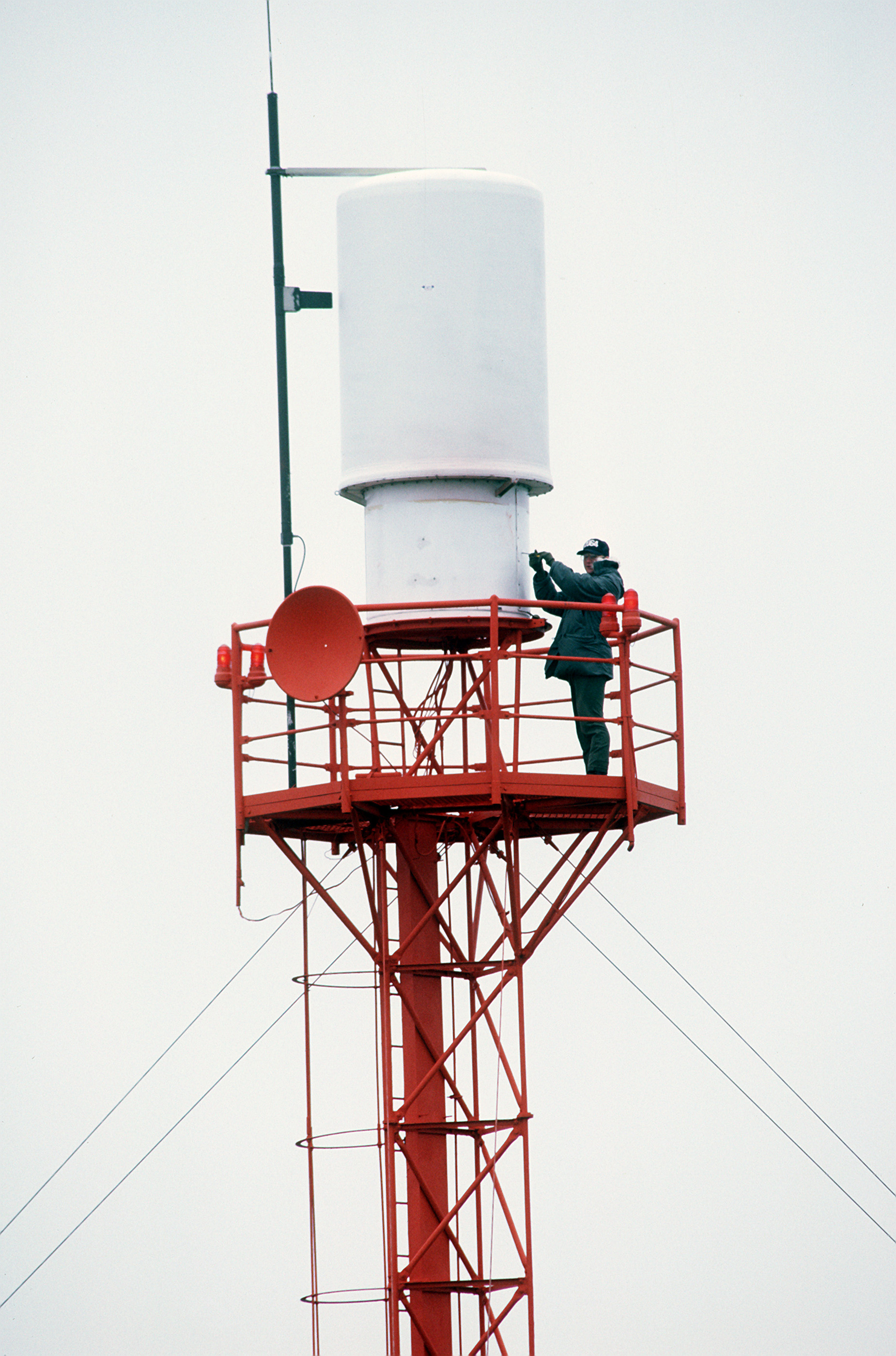
TACAN antenna at Shemya, Alaska

=== Mobile station ===
A radionavigation mobile station is – according to article 1.87 of the International Telecommunication Union's (ITU) ITU Radio Regulations (RR) – defined as "A radio station in the radionavigation service intended to be used while in motion or during halts at unspecified points."

Each radio station shall be classified by the radiocommunication service in which it operates permanently or temporarily. This station operates in a safety-of-life service and must be protected for Interferences.

In accordance with ITU Radio Regulations (article 1) this type of radio station might be classified as follows:
Radiodetermination station (article 1.86) of the radiodetermination service (article 1.40 )

- Radionavigation mobile station

Selection radionavigation mobile stations

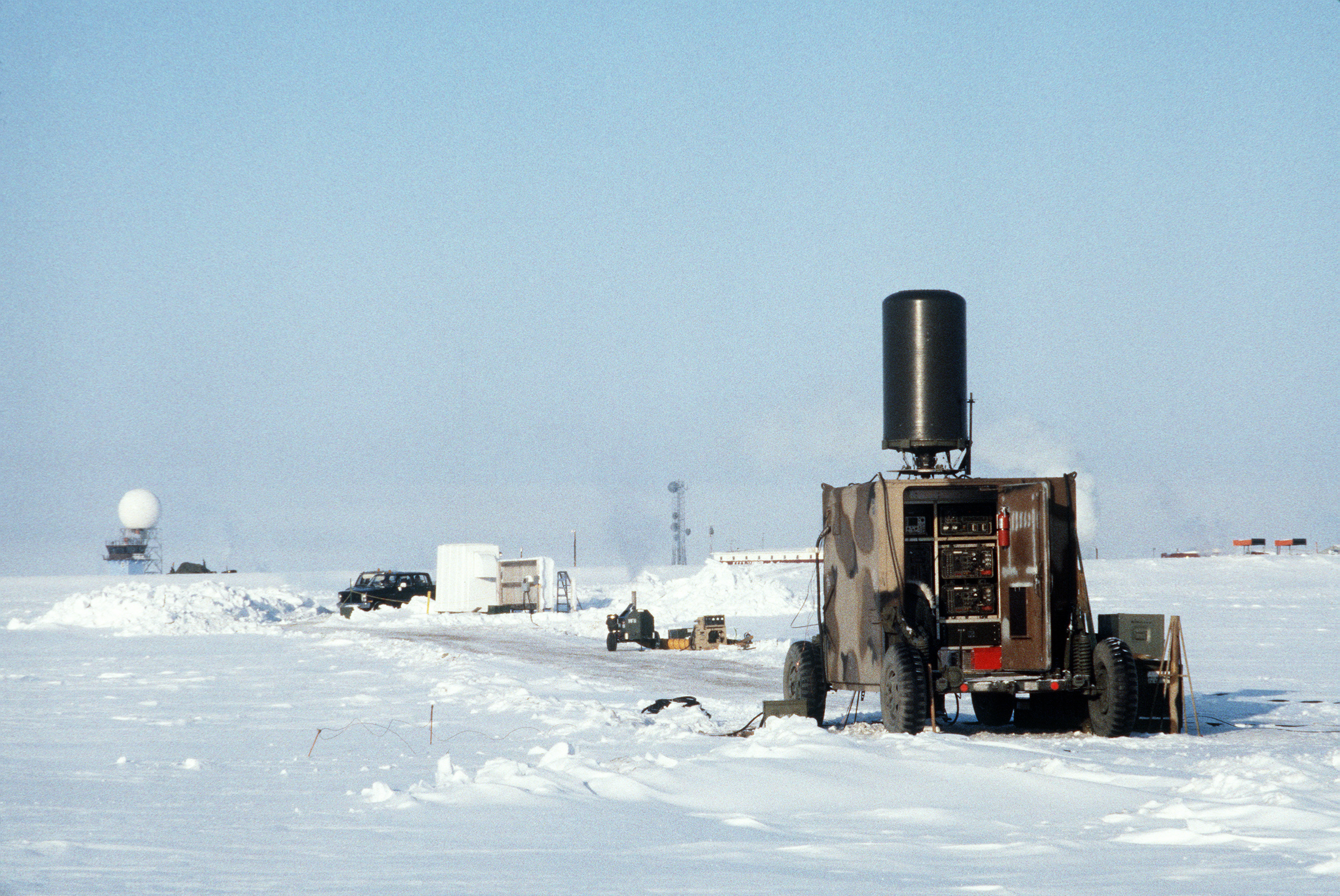
Mobile TACAN-station in Alaska

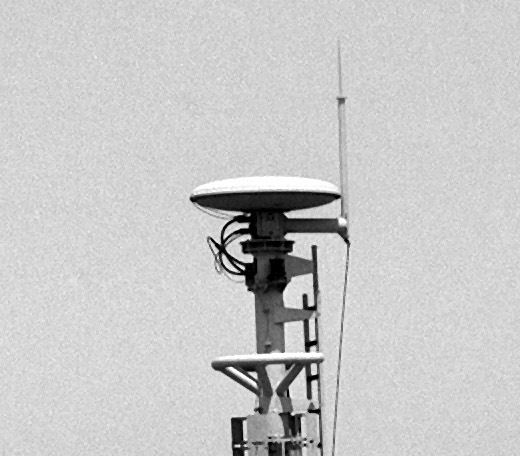
TACAN sea borne

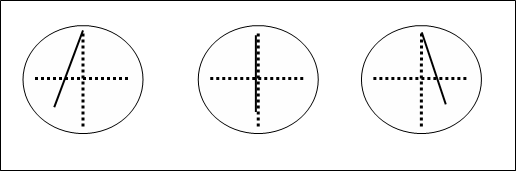
ILS receiver indicator onboard

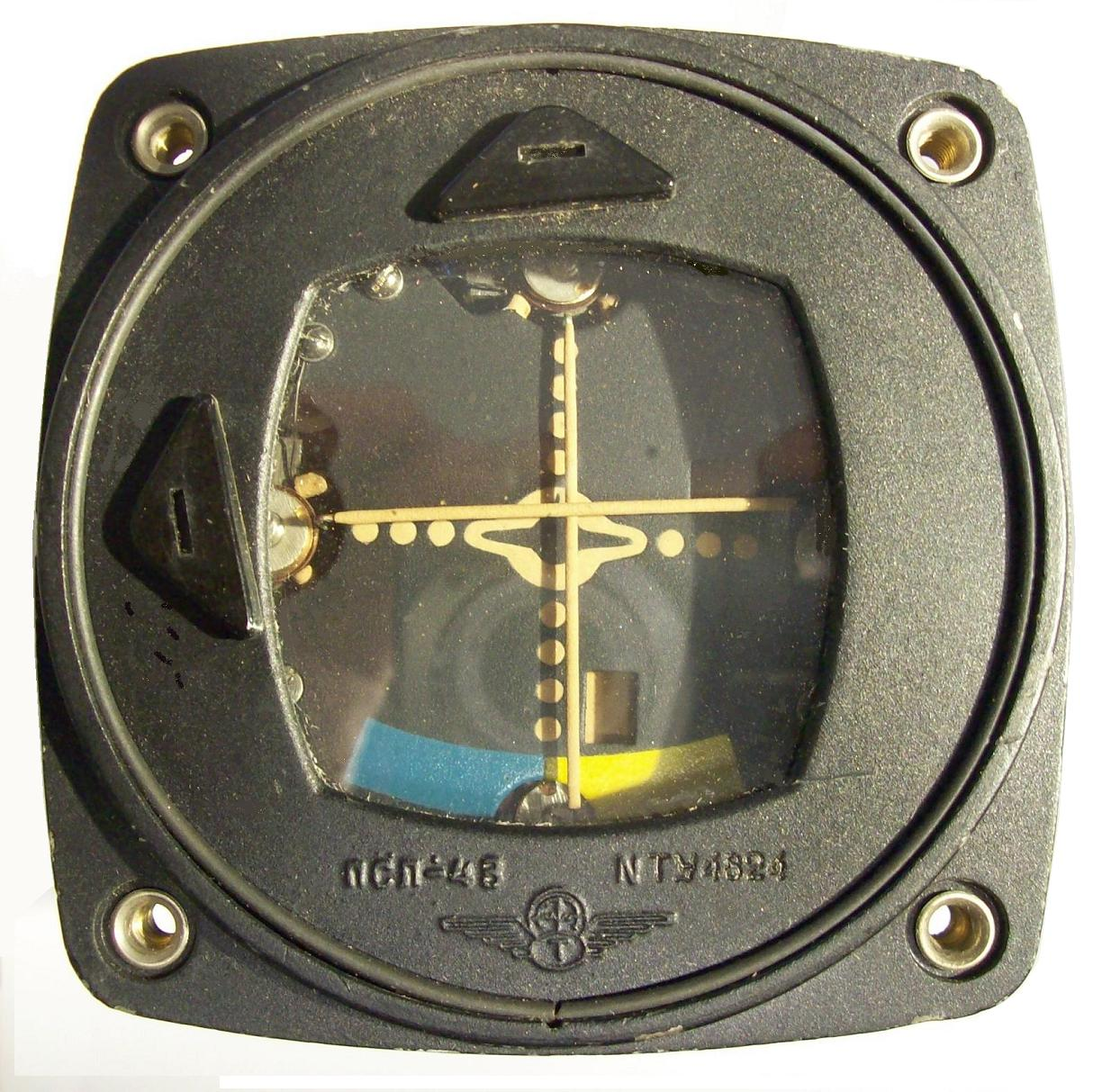
ILS indicator onboard aircraft

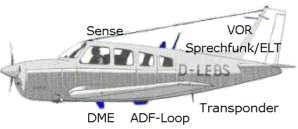
Antenna DME / VOR

== See also ==
- Ambrose Channel pilot cable
- American Practical Navigator
- Differential GPS (DGPS)
- Distance measuring equipment (DME)
- EGNOS (European Geostationary Navigation Overlay Service)
- Galileo positioning system (Galileo)
- Global Positioning System (GPS)
- Global Navigation Satellite System (GLONASS)
- Inertial navigation system
- Instrument landing system (ILS)
- Local Area Augmentation System (LAAS)
- Long-range navigation (LORAN)
- Marker beacon (three-light marker beacon system)
- Microwave landing system (MLS)
- Multilateration
- Non-directional beacon (NDB)
- Radio altimeter
- Radar navigation
- Real-time locating
- Receiver Autonomous Integrity Monitoring (RAIM)
- Satellite geodesy#Radio techniques
- Space Integrated GPS/INS (SIGI)
- SCR-277
- Tactical air navigation (TACAN)
- Transponder Landing System (TLS)
- Transit (satellite)
- VHF omnidirectional range (VOR)
- X-ray pulsar-based navigation
- Wide Area Augmentation System (WAAS)
- Wind triangle
