= Orfordness Beacon =

Early radio navigation system in the UK

Coordinates: 52°05′01.08″N 01°34′02.46″E

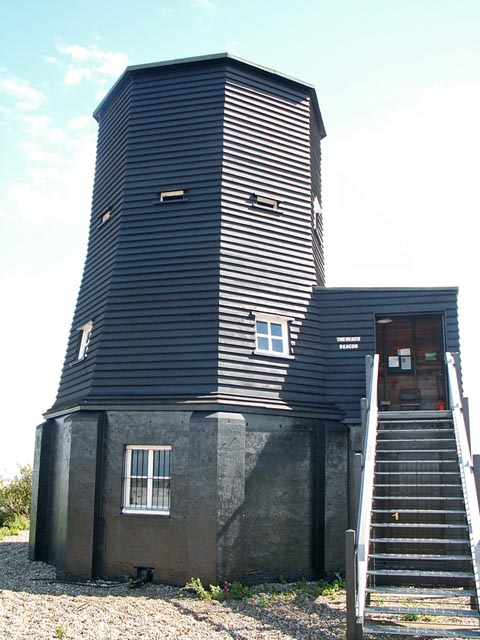
The Orfordness Beacon as it appeared in 2008.

Orford Ness, Suffolk, showing locations of main sites.

The Orfordness Rotating Wireless Beacon, known simply as the Orfordness Beacon or sometimes the Black Beacon, was an early radio navigation system introduced by the United Kingdom in July 1929. It allowed the angle to the station to be measured from any aircraft or ship with a conventional radio receiver, and was accurate to about a degree. A second station operating on the same principle was set up to provide wider area coverage and allow two-bearing fixes between Orford Ness and Farnborough Airport. The system was similar to the earlier German Telefunken Kompass Sender and the later Sonne system.

== Description ==
=== Background ===
In navigation, the determination of a "fix" requires two measurements to be taken. Using classical triangulation techniques, this was normally the measurement of two angles, or bearings, along the line-of-sight to prominent landmarks, like a lighthouse. After taking the two measurements, lines of position are drawn radiating from the landmark along the reverse angle. They will cross at some point, and their intersection determines the location of the navigator.

=== RDF ===
The introduction of portable radio systems in the early 20th century gave rise to the possibility of using radio broadcasters (beacons) as a landmark that would be visible to a radio receiver at very great ranges, hundreds of miles or more. The angle between the navigator and the beacon can be taken by using a simple mechanism known as a loop antenna which can be rotated around the vertical axis. As the antenna is rotated, the strength of the received signal varies, and drops to zero (the null) when the loop is perpendicular to the line to the beacon.

This technique, known as radio direction finding (RDF), is useful but only moderately accurate. Measurements better than a few degrees are difficult with a small antenna, and because of the electrical characteristics, it is not always easy to make a larger version that might provide more accuracy. Moreover, the addition of a loop antenna may be difficult on smaller vehicles, or difficult to operate for those without a dedicated navigator.

=== Orfordness' solution ===
The Orfordness Beacon was a simple solution to these problems, which essentially moved the loop antenna from the vehicle to the beacon. The station broadcast a continuous AM longwave signal at 288.5 kHz (1040 m) through a large loop antenna which was mechanically rotated at 1 rpm, or 6 degrees a second. As the antenna passed north, the signal was briefly keyed with the morse code signal for the letter "V" (dot-dot-dot-dash), before returning again to a continuous signal.

At two points during the antenna's rotation, it would be perpendicular to the receiver. During these instants, the audible signal would disappear, an event known as a "null". Navigation using the Orfordness Beacon was quite simple. Navigators simply tuned in the station on their radios and waited for the V signal to be broadcast. They noted the time of the V and counted off the seconds until they heard the null. This could be easily accomplished with the use of a stopwatch. The time in seconds between the ending of the V and hearing the null was then multiplied by 6 to produce the angle from the station to the receiver.

This led to the possibility of the user being confused as to which null they were located on, as there are two, located 180 degrees apart (either side of the antenna). In practice this is a relatively minor concern, as traditional navigation methods are normally able to resolve this discrepancy – only one of the angles makes sense at a given time. In order to help resolve even this minor problem, the system also broadcast the letter "B" (dash-dot-dot-dot) as it passed east, helping the listener to identify the lobes. This also served the purpose of allowing the navigator to check that the system was operating properly by timing the period between the V and B, and checking that it was the expected 15 seconds.

=== System construction and expansion ===
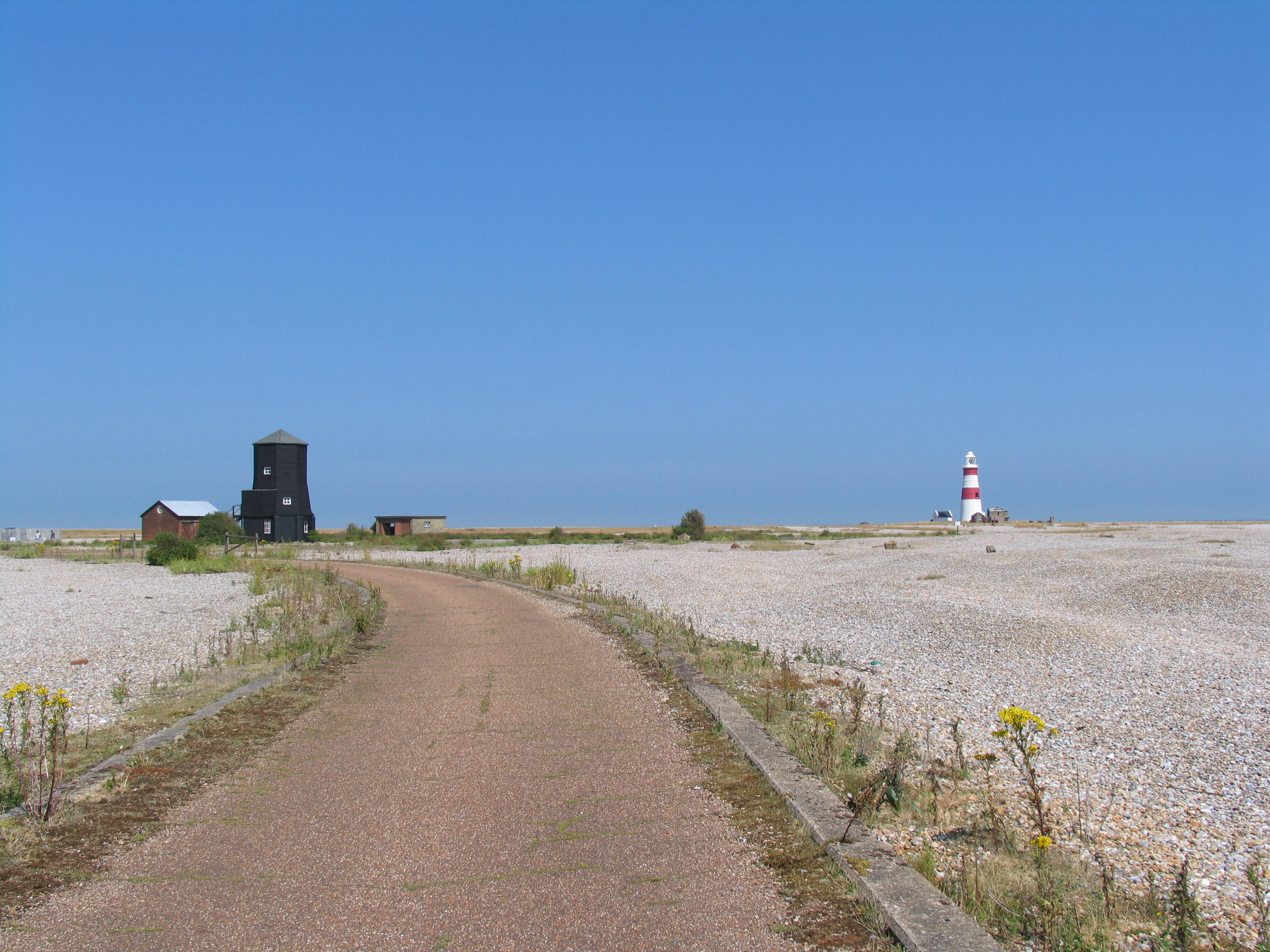
Looking north-east toward the Beacon, with its powerhouse to the right and barracks to the left. The now-demolished Orfordness Lighthouse, once also a racon beacon, is on the far right.

The original Orfordness Beacon was constructed in a small building that looked similar to the lower portion of a Dutch windmill. Painted black, it remains a prominent landmark today. The system went online in July 1929.

The Orfordness Beacon did not broadcast continuously, but on a five-minute on-off pattern. This allowed for the construction of a second Beacon at RAE Farnborough, south-west of London. The Farnborough station broadcast on the same frequency as Orford, using the letters "G" (dash-dash-dot) for north and "W" (dot-dash-dash) for east. Orfordness broadcast on the first five minutes of every ten-minute period, and Farnborough on the second five minutes. Operations started in early 1930, but was first used only experimentally, for short periods on weekdays.

=== Accuracy ===
A report compiled for the Merchant Marine demonstrated an effective range of about 100 miles, day or night. During the day, a minimum accuracy of 2 degrees measured, and 1 degree was common. However, at night the system degraded considerably, with measurement errors as great as 20 degrees.

== See also ==
- Telefunken Kompass Sender
- Orfordness transmitting station
