= Safety service =

Telecommunications device

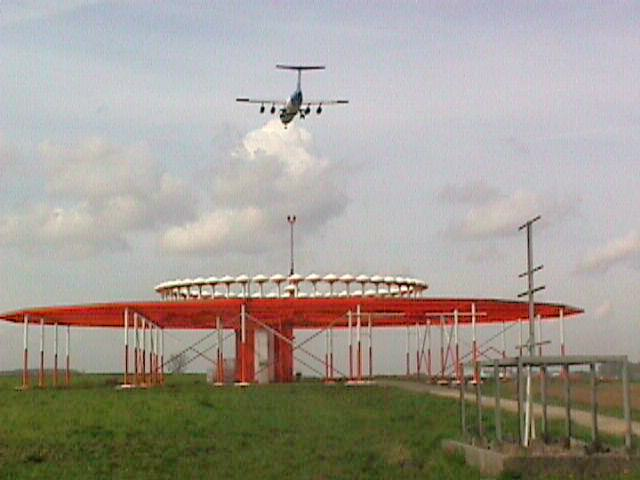
Radio stations of RNS / safety service, VOR/ DME

Safety service (also: safety radiocommunication service or safety-of-life service) is – according to Article 1.59 of the International Telecommunication Union's (ITU) Radio Regulations (RR) – defined as «A radiocommunication service used permanently or temporarily for the safeguarding of human life and property.»

Few typical examples of safety services are as follows:

- Aeronautical mobile service (article 1.32)
  - Aeronautical mobile (R)° service (article 1.33)
  - Aeronautical mobile-satellite service (article 1.35)
    - Aeronautical mobile-satellite (R)° service (article 1.36)
- Radionavigation service (article 1.42)
  - Radionavigation-satellite service (article 1.43)
  - Maritime radionavigation service (article 1.44)

(R)° = abbreviation to route flights (route)

== See also ==
- Radio station
- Radiocommunication service
