= Radio fix =

In telecommunications and position fixing, the term radio fix has the following meanings:

- The locating of a radio transmitter by bearings taken from two or more direction finding stations, the site of the transmitter being at the point of intersection.
- The location of a ship or aircraft by determining the direction of radio signals coming to the ship or aircraft from two or more sending stations, the locations of which are known.

Compare triangulation.

== Obtaining a radio fix ==
Obtaining a Line of Position using the bearing to a single radio station.

Obtaining a position fix using the bearing to two radio stations.

A single transmitter can be used to give a line of position (LOP) of the craft. The (true) bearing to the station from the craft, TB or QUJ, is composed of the true heading, TH, plus the relative bearing, RB, of the station. The bearing from the station (QTE) is found by adding 180° to the QUJ figure.

The line of position is then the line of bearing QUJ (i.e. from the station to the receiver) passing through the station.

$$\mbox{LOP}=\mbox{TH}+\mbox{RB}+180$$

For the diagram on the right, we have:

$$\mbox{LOP}=120+40+180$$
$$\mbox{LOP}=340$$

A radio fix on two stations can be found in exactly the same way. The intersection of the two position lines gives the position of the receiver. For the diagram on the right, the LOPs are found as before:

$$\mbox{LOP1}=120+320+180$$
$$\mbox{LOP1}=260$$

$$\mbox{LOP2}=120+40+180$$
$$\mbox{LOP2}=340$$

Remembering that the LOPs pass through their respective stations, it is now simple to find the location of the craft.

Remember too, that bearings and direction are given/recorded with respect to True North and to Magnetic North. Values used by mobile stations usually need to be converted from Magnetic to True. (Fixed stations are expected to use True).

== See also ==
- Direction finding
- Radio determination
- Radio direction finder
- Radio location
- Radio navigation

== Sources ==
- This article incorporates public domain material from Federal Standard 1037C. General Services Administration. Archived from the original on 2022-01-22.
