= Radiodetermination =

Active and passive means of determining position via radio waves

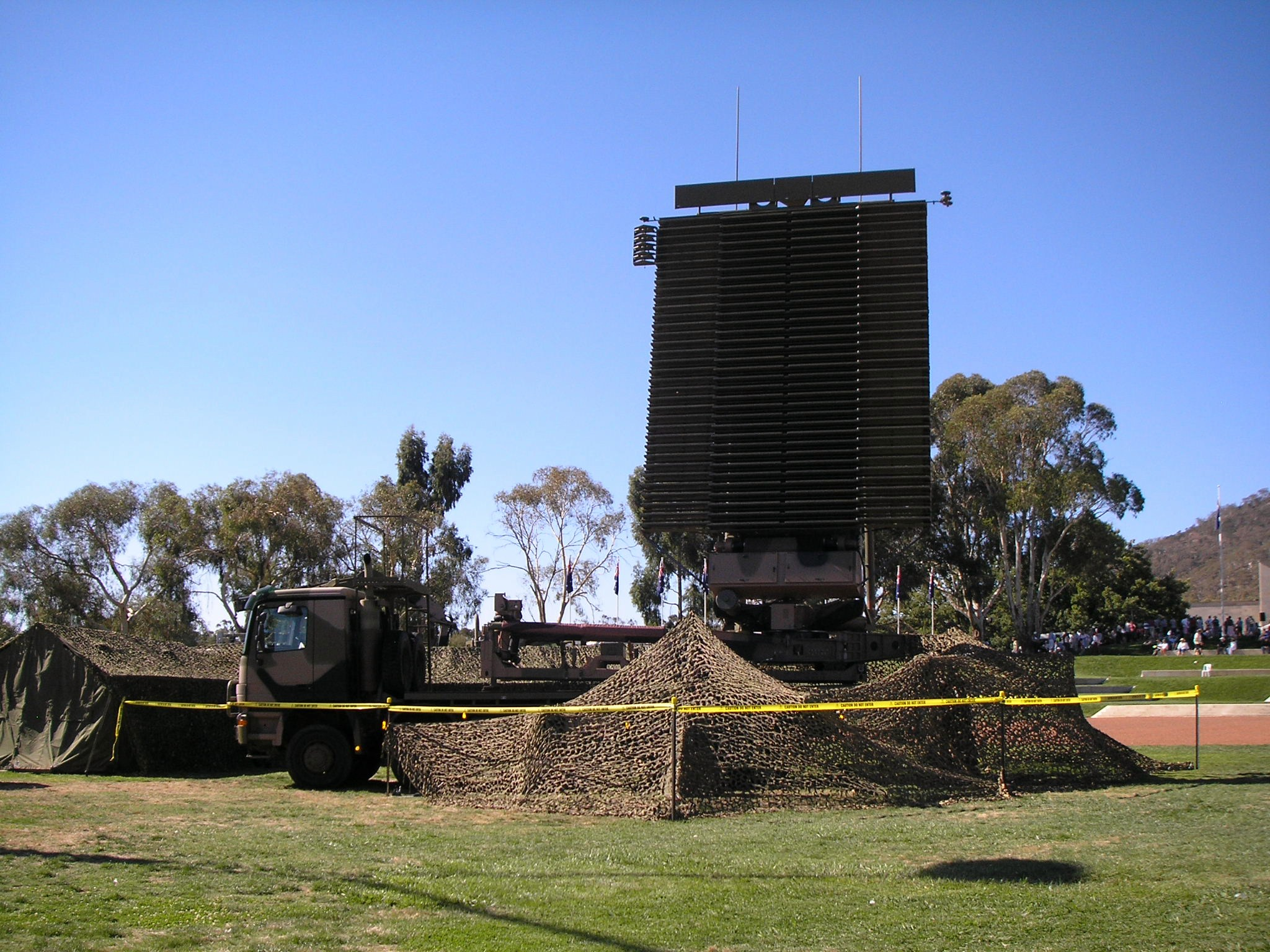
RAAF AN-FPS-117 radar in 2007

As defined by FS-1037C and ITU Radio Regulations, radiodetermination is:

the determination of the position, velocity or other characteristics of an object, or the obtaining of information relating to these parameters, by means of the propagation properties of radio waves

There are two main fields to radiodetermination:

- radionavigation: "used for the purposes of navigation, including obstruction warning", which is mainly active;
- radiolocation: "used for purposes other than those of radionavigation", which is mainly passive.

Radar is a radiodetermination system based on the reflection (or retransmission) of a radio wave by an object at a position to be determined.

== Examples ==
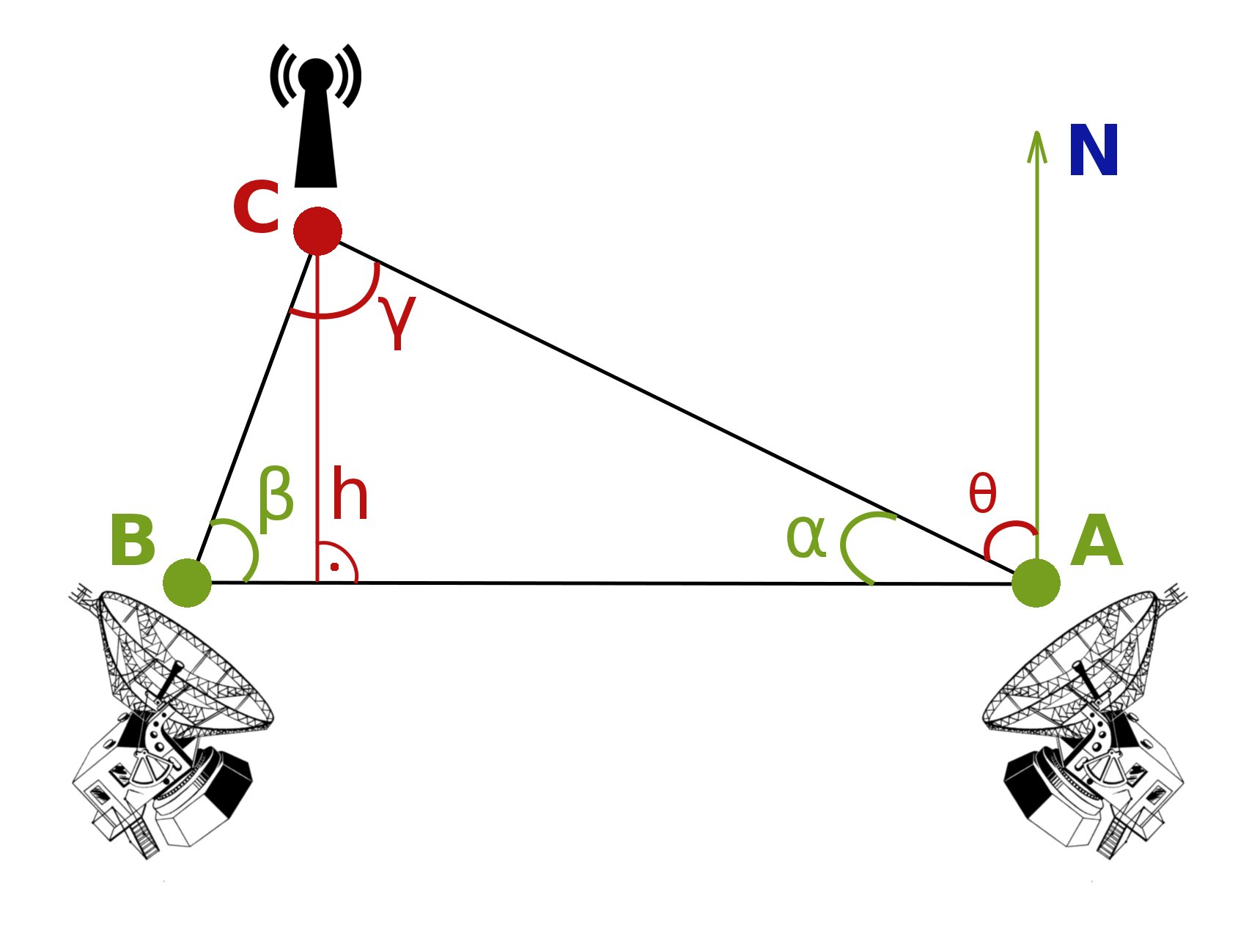
Triangulation using radiodetermination

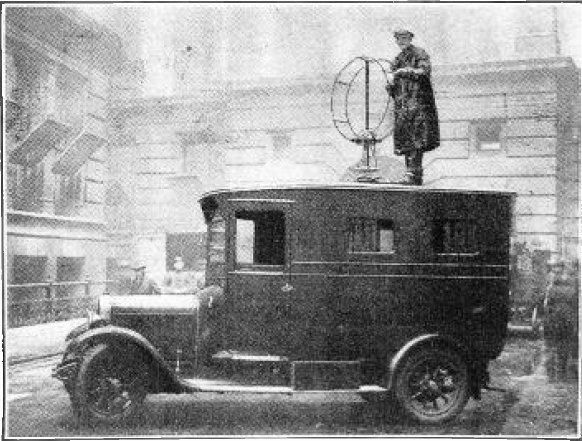
British Post Office mobile RDF, 1927

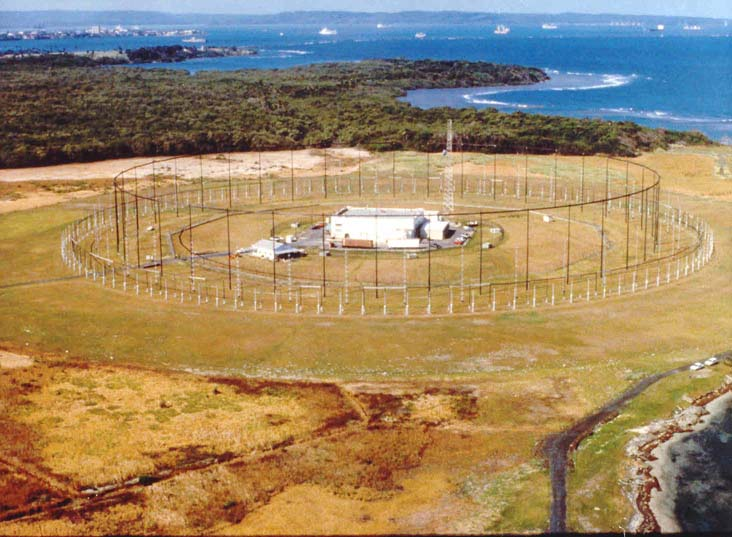
Direction-finding system Galeta Island

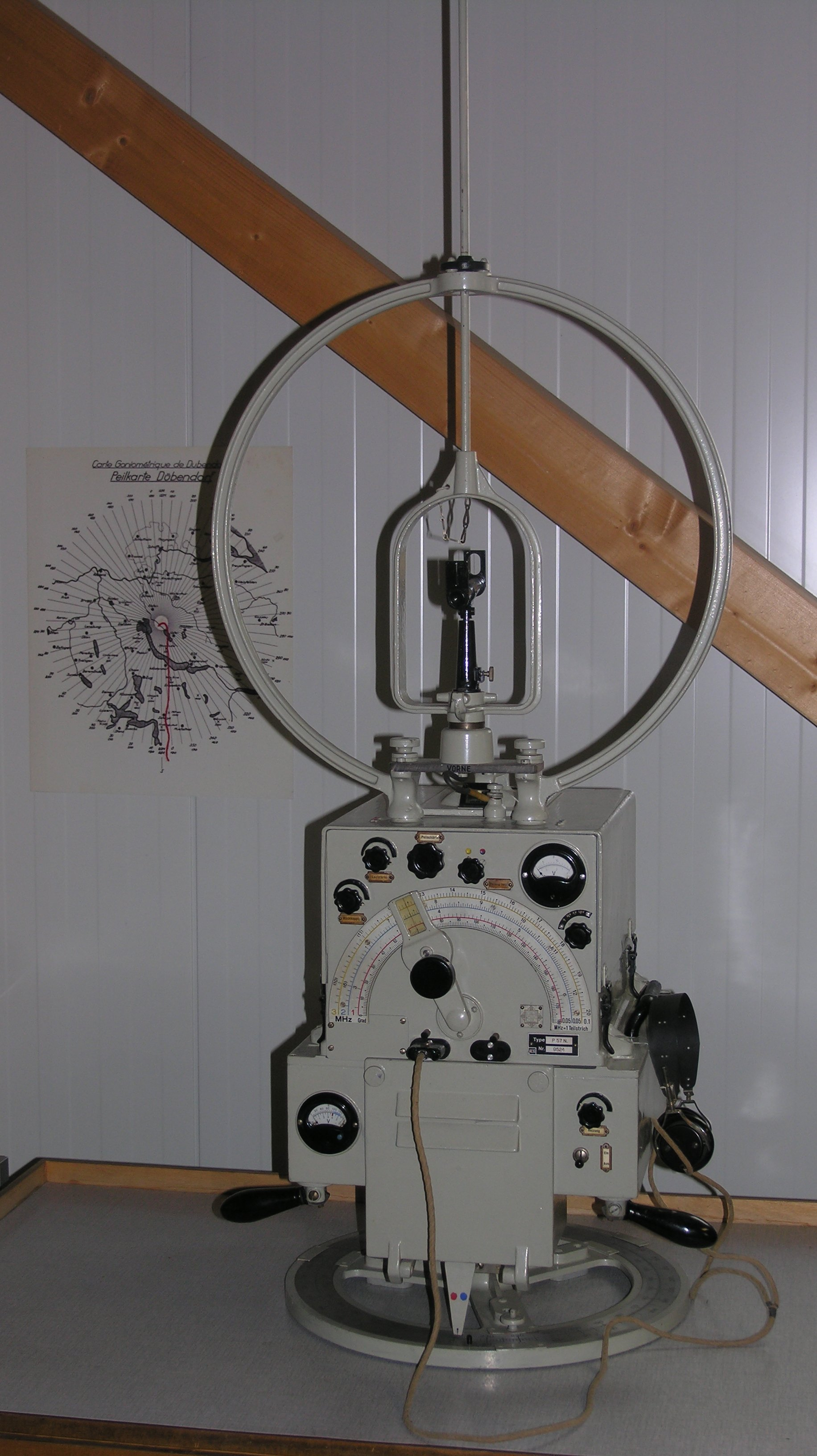
Direction finder with direction-finding aerial

== International regulation ==
Radiodetermination service is – according to Article 1.4 of the International Telecommunication Union's (ITU) Radio Regulations (RR) – defined as "A radiocommunication service for the purpose of radiodetermination."

Radiodetermination-satelliteservice is – according to Article 1.41 of the ITU-RR – defined as "A radiocommunication service for the purpose of radiodetermination involving the use of one or more space stations. This service may also include feeder links necessary for its own operation."

=== Classification ===
This radiocommunication service is classified in accordance with ITU-RR (article 1) as follows:
Radiodetermination service (article 1.40)

- Radiodetermination-satellite service (article 1.41)
- Radionavigation service (article 1.42)
  - Radionavigation-satellite service (article 1.43)
  - Maritime radionavigation service (article 1.444)
    - Maritime radionavigation-satellite service (article 1.45)
  - Aeronautical radionavigation service (article 1.46)
    - Aeronautical radionavigation-satellite service (article 1.47)
- Radiolocation service (article 1.48)
  - Radiolocation-satellite service (article 1.49)

=== Frequency allocation ===
The allocation of radio frequencies is provided according to Article 5 of the ITU-RR(edition 2012).

In order to improve harmonisation in spectrum utilisation, the majority of service-allocations stipulated in this document were incorporated in national Tables of Frequency Allocations and Utilisations which is within the responsibility of the appropriate national administration. The allocation might be primary, secondary, exclusive, and shared.

- primary allocation: is indicated by writing in capital letters
- secondary allocation: is indicated by small letters
- exclusive or shared utilization: is within the responsibility of administrations

Example of frequency allocation

Allocation to services
Region 1	Region 2	Region 3
1 610–1 610.6 MHz MOBILE-SATELLITE (Earth-to-space) AERONAUTICAL RADIONAVIGATION	1 610–1 610.6 MHz MOBILE-SATELLITE (Earth-to-space) AERONAUTICAL RADIONAVIGATION RADIODETERMINATION-SATELLITE (Earth-to-space)	1 610–1 610.6 MOBILE-SATELLITE (Earth-to-space) AERONAUTICAL RADIONAVIGATION Radiodetermination-satellite (Earth-to-space)

== Stations ==
A radiodetermination station is – according to article 1.86 of the ITU-RR – defined as "A radio station in the radiodetermination service."

A radiodetermination station uses reception of radio waves in order to determine the location of an object, under the condition that this thing is reflecting and/or transmitting radio waves. This designation may also be the collective name of any radar set in general, up to target location, illuminating, acquisition and tracking, as well as radar sigh, altimeter and precision-guided munitions or bombs.

Each radiodetermination station shall be classified by the radiocommunication service in which it operates permanently or temporarily. In accordance with ITU-RR (article 1) this type of radio station might be classified as follows:

Radiodetermination station

- Radionavigation mobile station (article 1.87) of the radionavigation service (article 1.42)
- Radionavigation land station (article 1.88) of the radionavigation service
- Radiolocation mobile station (article 1.89) of the radiolocation service (article 1.48)
- Radiolocation land station (article 1.90) of the radiolocation service
- Radio direction-finding station (article 1.91)

== Gallery ==
Examples of radiodetermination stations

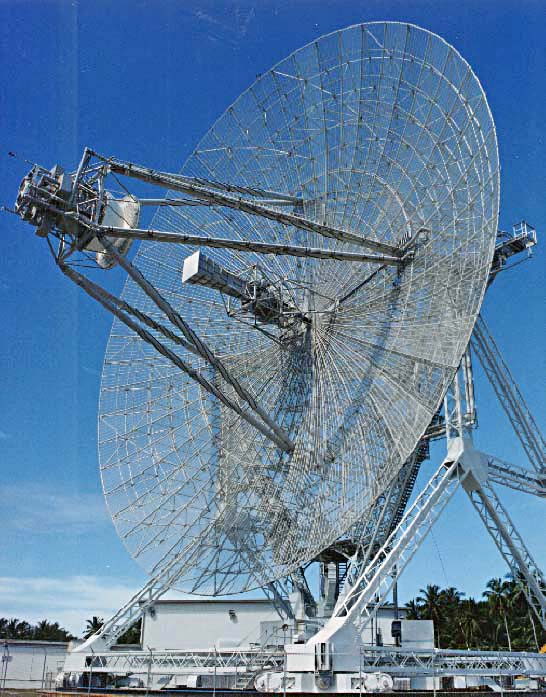
A long-range radar (parabolic antenna)

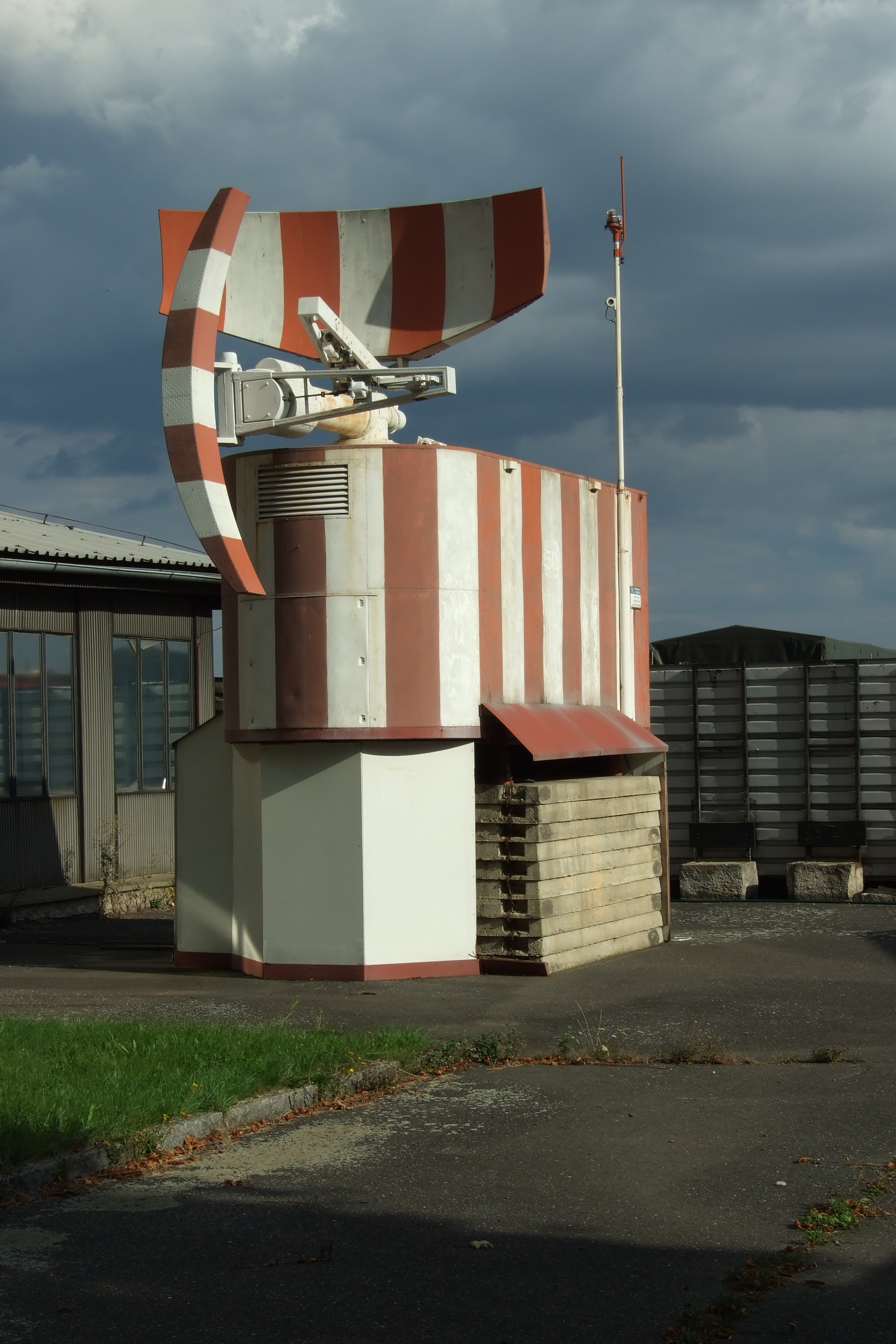
Air Traffic Control

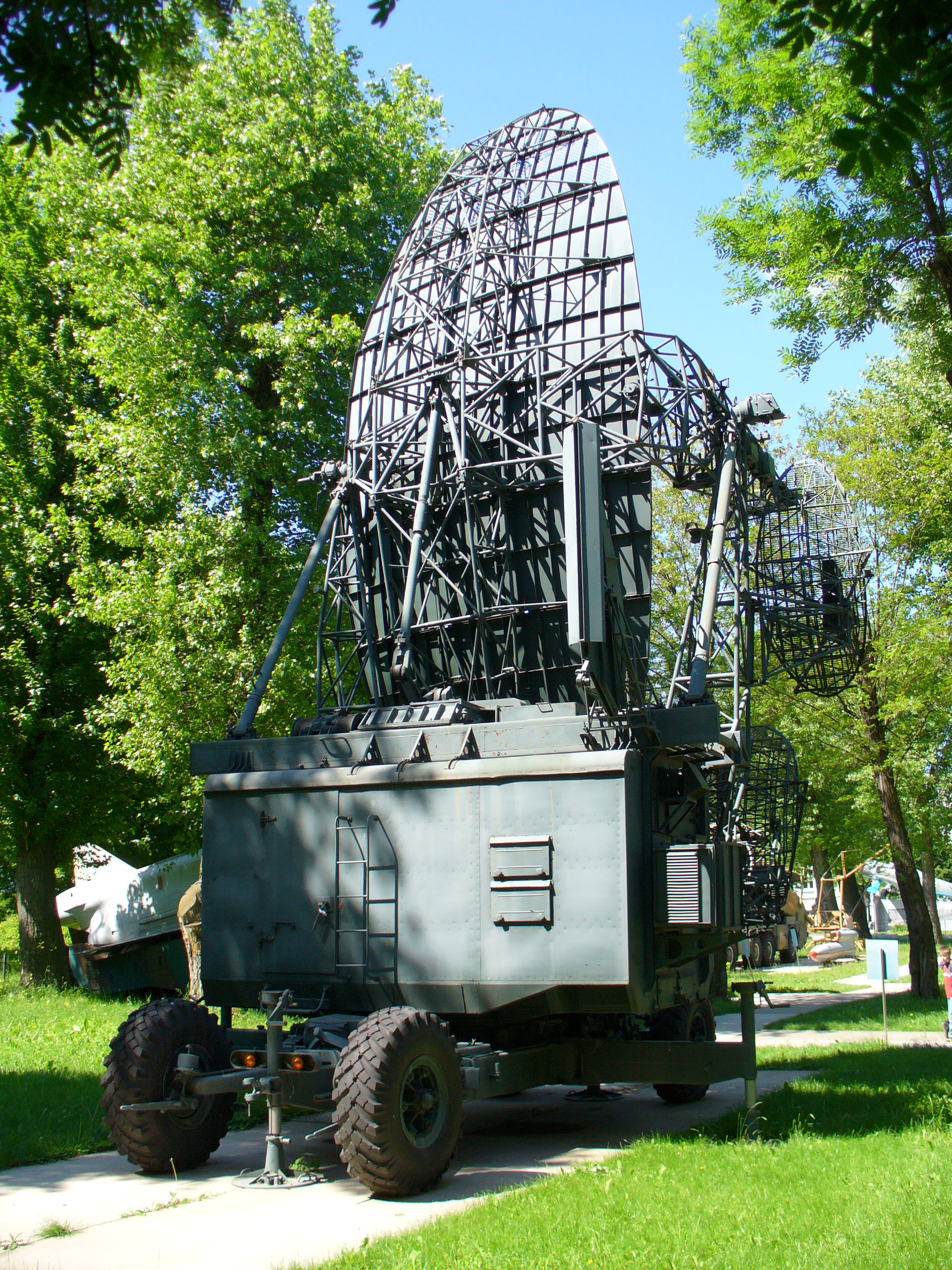
mobile High finder radar

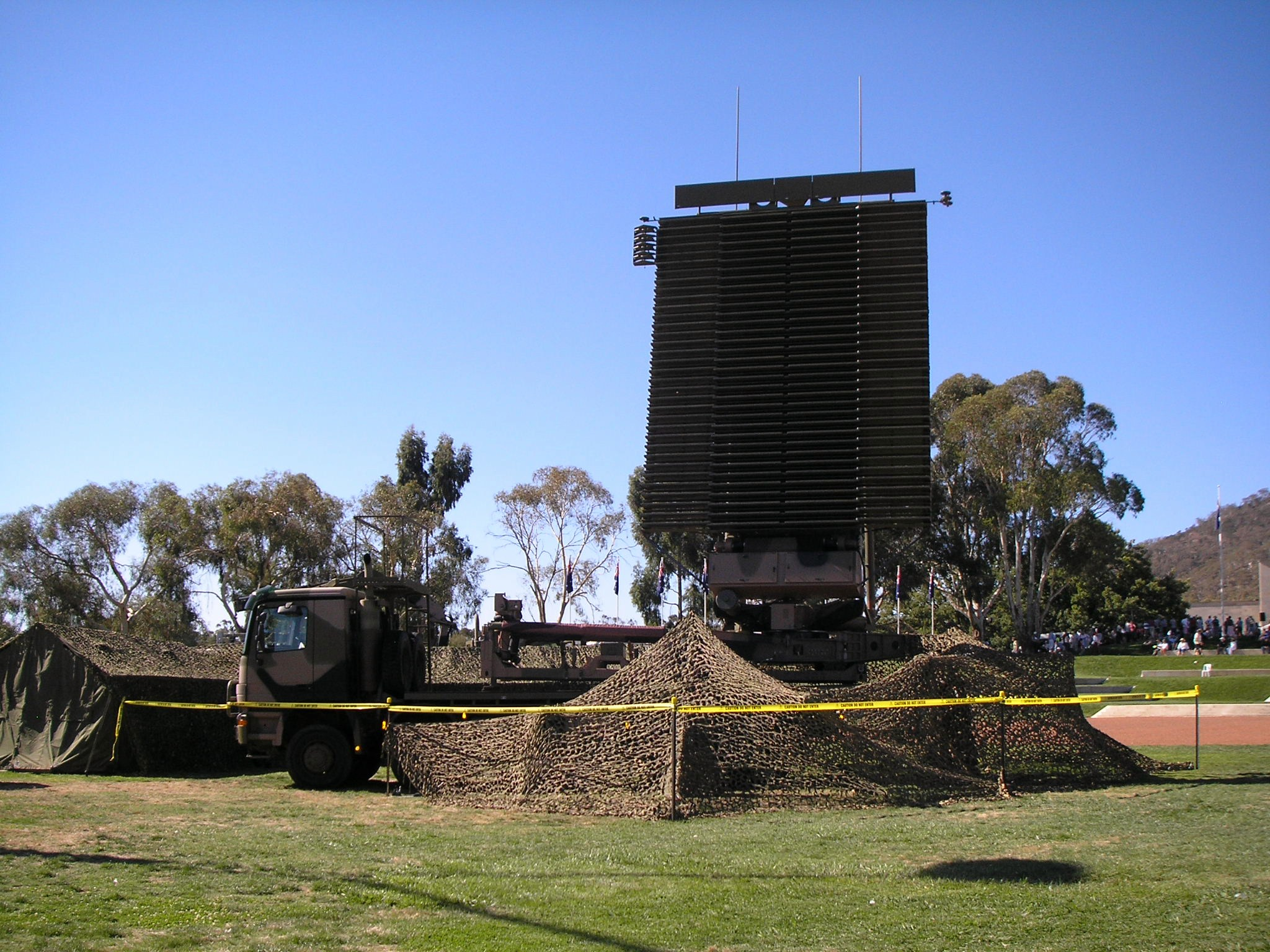
RAAF radar, AN/TPS-77

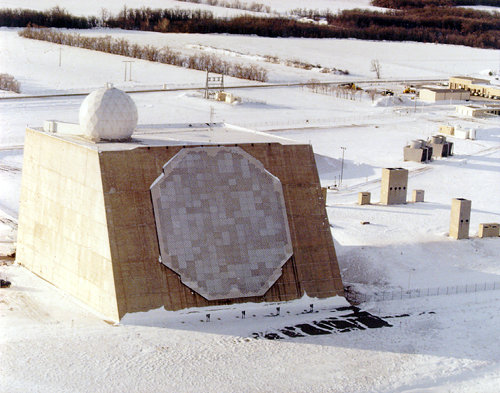
AN/FPQ-16 PARCS (Active Phased Array Radar)

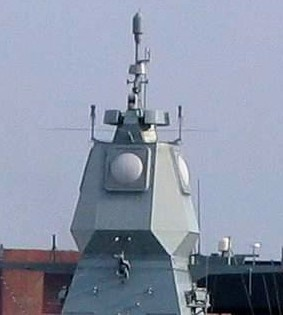
Sea-mobile radar (Frigate Hamburg)

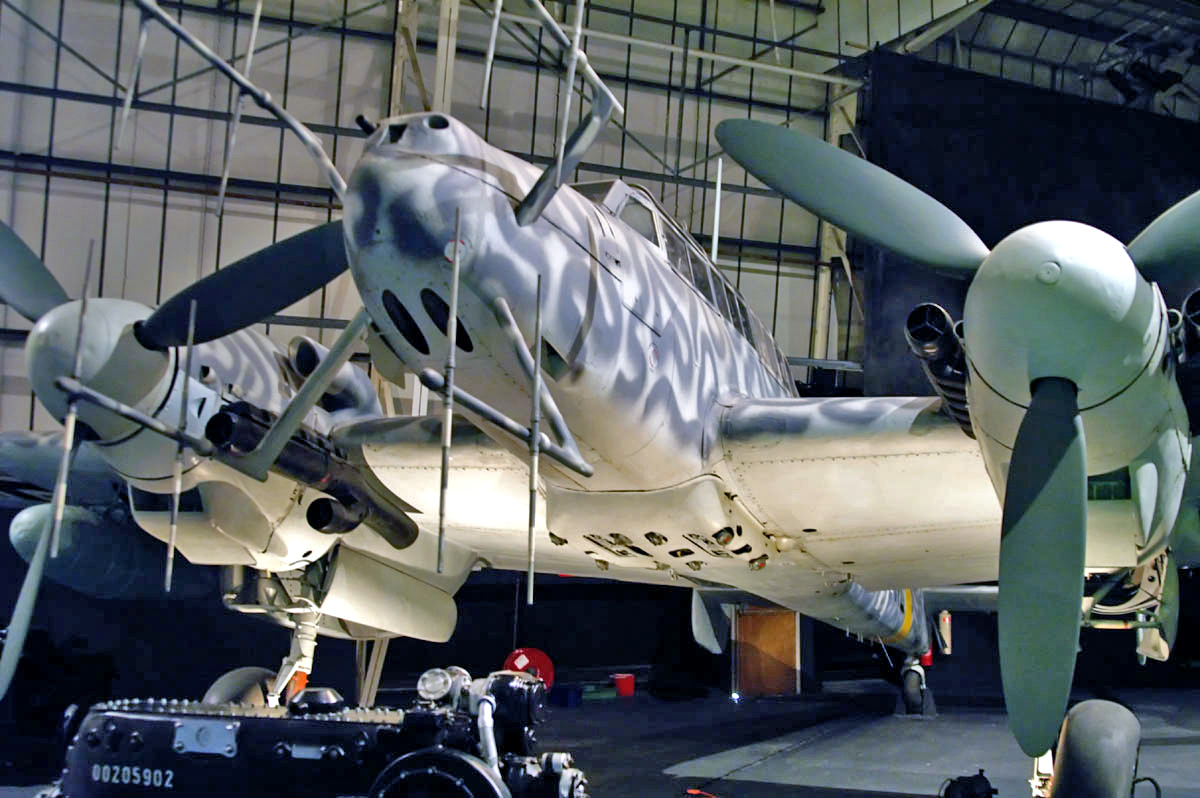
Air borne radar „Lichtenstein SN-2“ in the ME Bf 110G

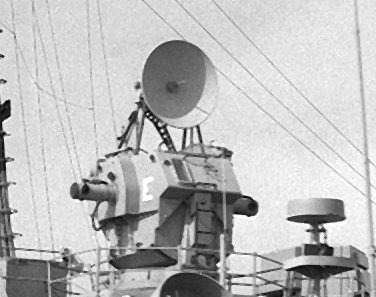
Weapon homing radar

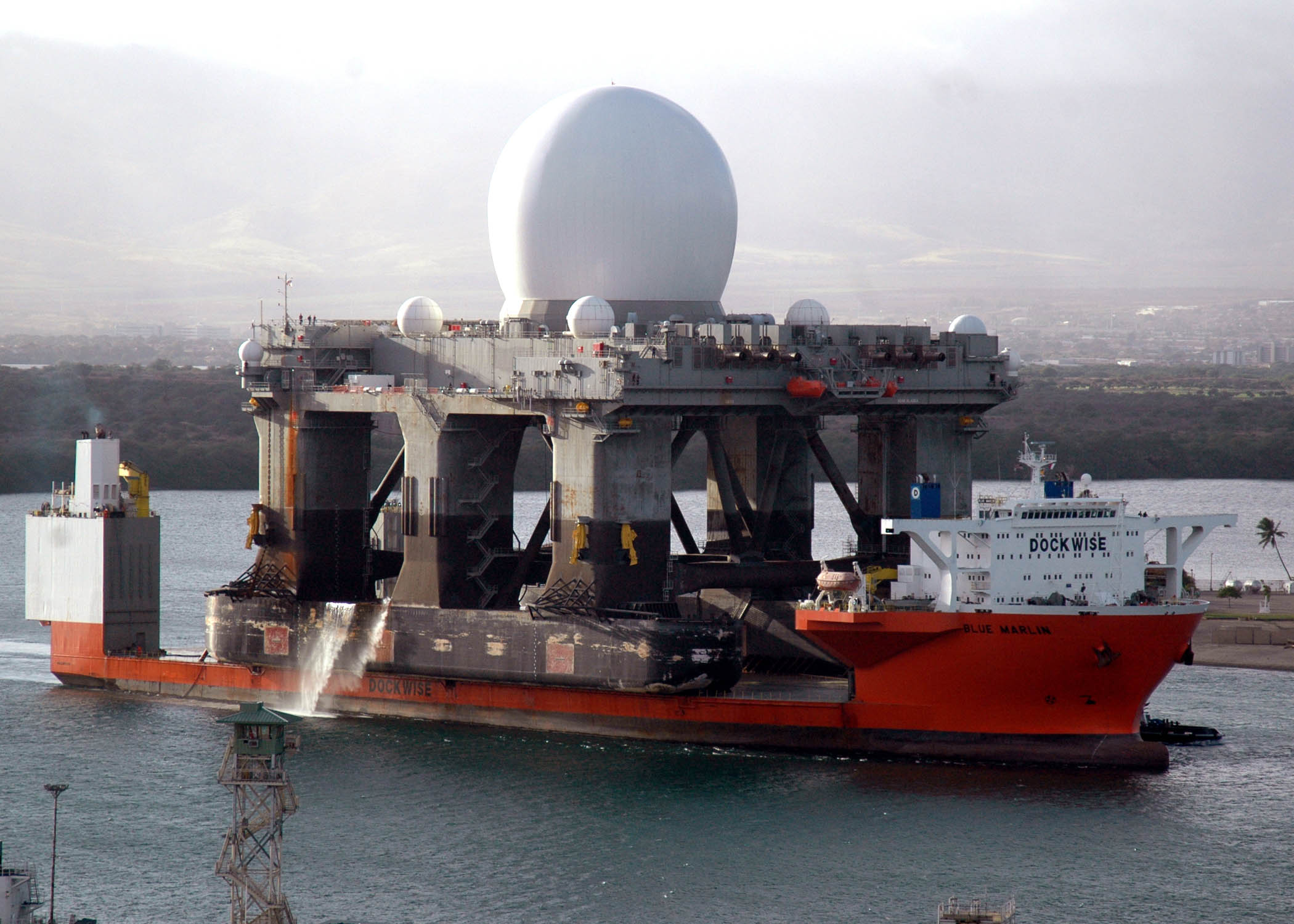
Sea-based x-band radar

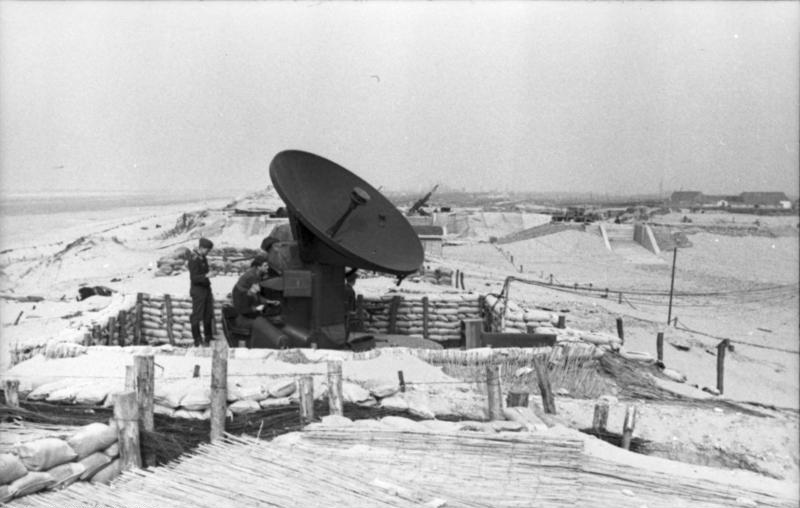
Land radar (Fire control radar FuMG 39 „Würzburg“)
Examples of satellites carriers of space radio stations dedicated to the radiodetermination-satellite service

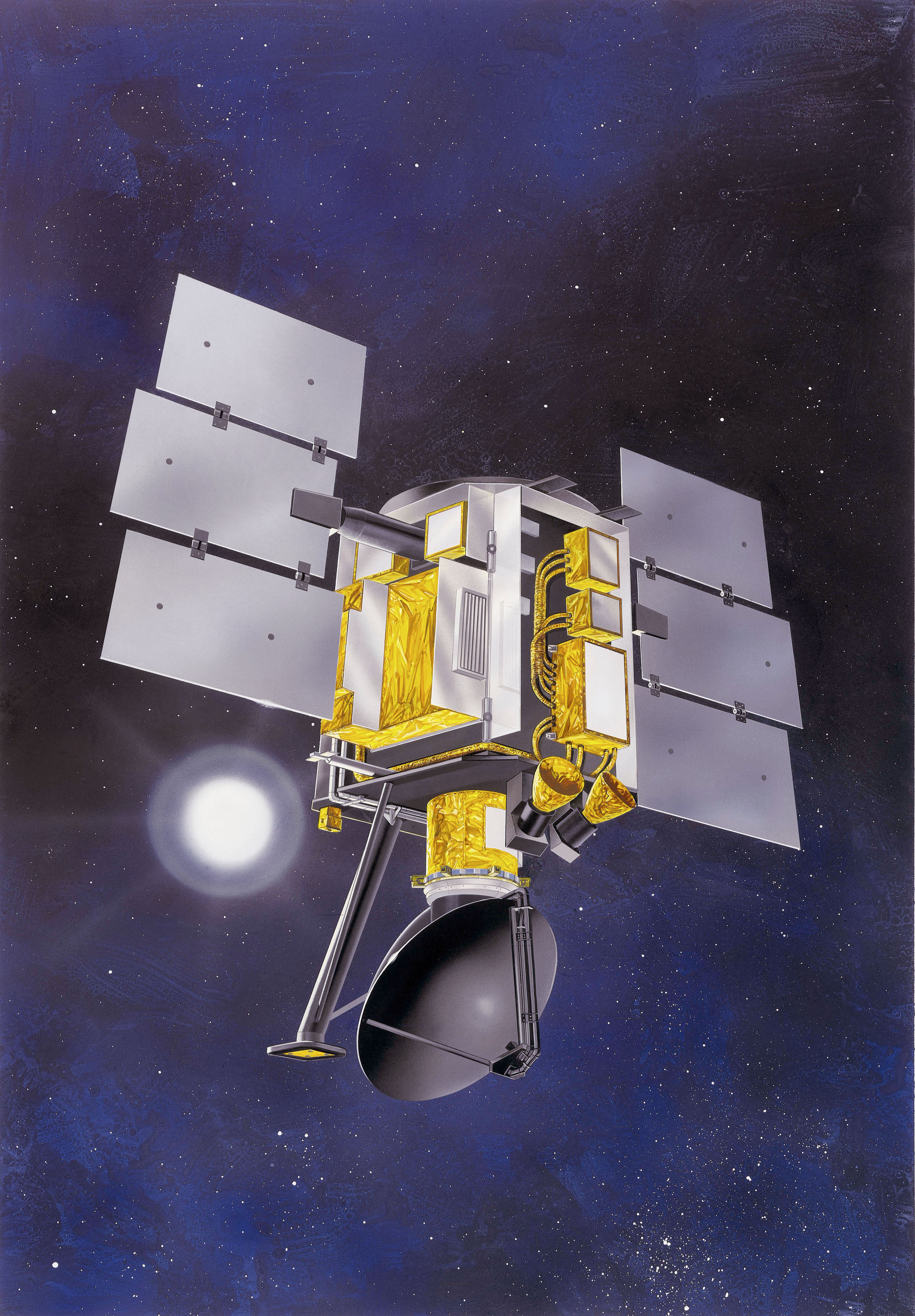
QuikSCAT-Satellite, with Wind-profiling-radar

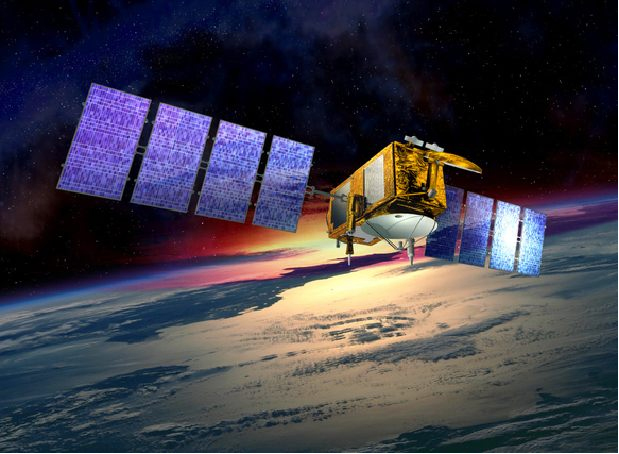
OSTM-06-Satellite, with High-altimeter-radar

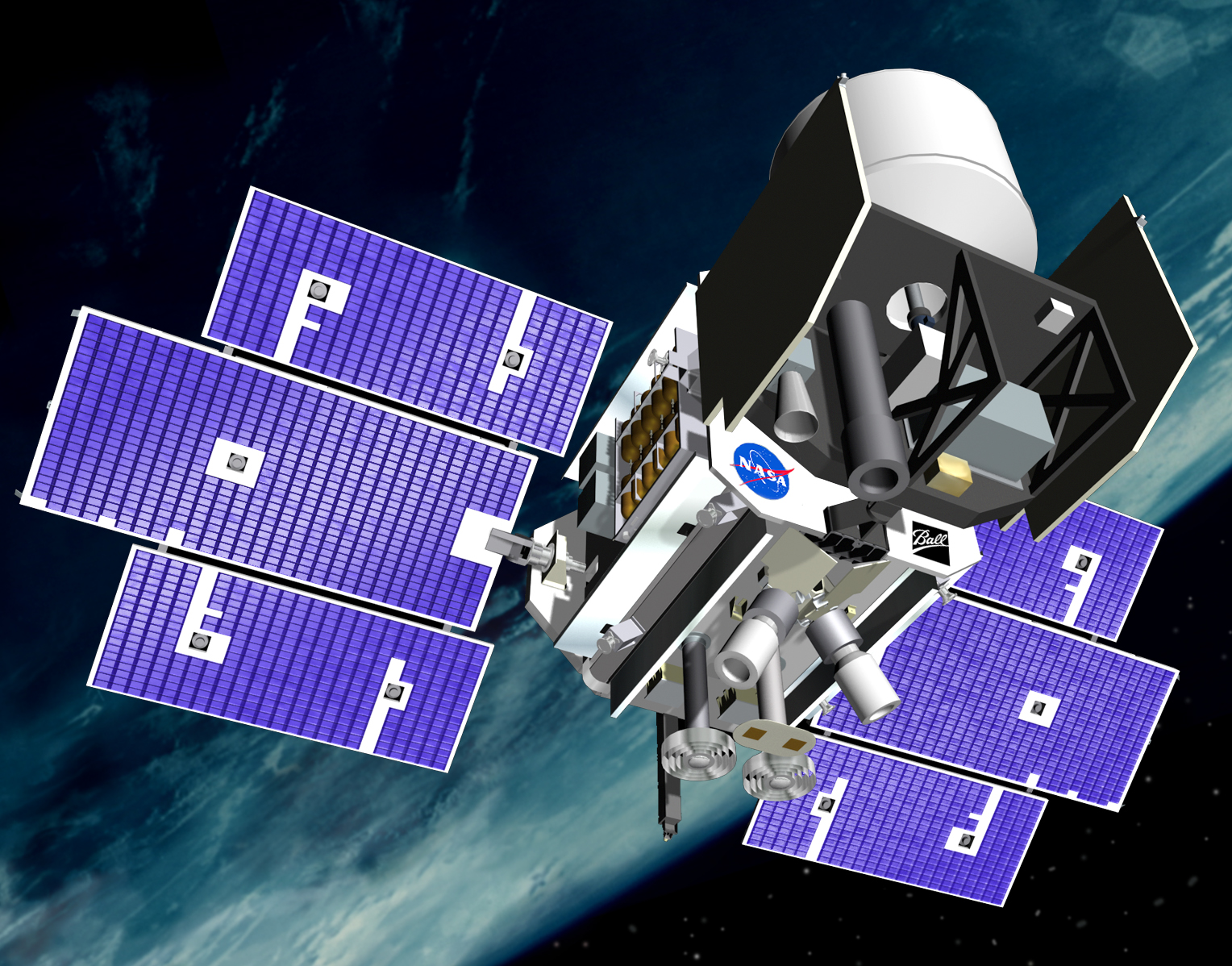
ICESat1-Satellite, with Multi-purpose-radar

== See also ==
- Real time locating
