= Air traffic safety electronics personnel =

People maintaining air traffic systems

Occupation
- Names: Air traffic safety electronics personnel (ICAO)
- Synonyms: ATSEP; Air traffic engineer; Airway transportation systems specialist (ATSS); Communication, navigation and surveillance officer (CNSO)
- Occupation type: Profession
- Activity sectors: Civil aviation, air traffic management (ATM), communication, navigation and surveillance (CNS)

Description
- Competencies: Electronic engineering; RF and telecommunications engineering; Radar and surveillance systems; Terrestrial and satellite radio navigation aids; Computer networking and system administration; Safety assurance and systems engineering
- Education required: Degree in electrical engineering, electronics, telecommunications, or computer engineering; Vocational avionics / electronics certification; ATSEP qualification and system/equipment rating training (under ICAO Doc 10057 / EASA Part-PERS)
- Fields of employment: Air navigation service providers (ANSPs); Civil aviation authorities; Airport authorities; Military air traffic services; CNS/ATM equipment manufacturers
- Related jobs: Air traffic controller; Avionics technician; Electronics engineer; Telecommunications engineer; Systems engineer

Air traffic safety electronics personnel (ATSEP) is an International Civil Aviation Organization term for the electronic engineers involved with the creation and support of the ground-based electronic hardware and software systems used to support air navigation and air traffic management. In India they were known as CNSO (Communication navigation surveillance officer). Airports Authority officers association India started celebrating CNSO day from 25 November 2013 later on from November 12, 2015, it started celebrated as ATSEP day. The association started first ever commemoration of ATSEP (CNSO) is now known as ATSEPA(l).

Often employed by Air Navigation Service Providers, ATSEP are mainly engineers, technocrats, hardware and software specialists who are responsible for the specification, procurement, installation, integration, calibration, maintenance, safety assurance and monitoring of these systems. The equipment ranges from discrete specialist electronic systems to commercial off-the-shelf computer hardware running specialist software designed and maintained to provide a safety-of-life service to aircraft. The systems provide communication and navigation services for aircraft, surveillance (e.g. radar), flight data processing and the brain behind air traffic control system.

ATSEP activities are heavily grounded in systems engineering, safety engineering, and radio engineering. In many English-speaking countries, ATSEP are simply referred to as "engineers", even though the discipline encompasses a spectrum of professional engineers and highly trained technicians.

== Technical domains ==
Under ICAO and European training standards, ATSEP technical expertise is categorised across six primary disciplines:

=== Communication (COM) ===
ATSEPs maintain air-ground and ground-ground voice and data communication systems:

- Voice communications - High frequency (HF), very high frequency (VHF), and ultra high frequency (UHF) radio transmitters and receivers; voice communication control systems (VCCS); voice over IP (VoIP) implementations for air traffic management (ATM VoIP); controller–pilot data link communications (CPDLC); and emergency radio channels.
- Data networks and messaging - Aeronautical Fixed Telecommunication Network (AFTN), Aeronautical Telecommunication Network (ATN), Aeronautical Message Handling System (AMHS), VHF Data Link (VDL Mode 2), and emerging broadband systems such as L-band Digital Aeronautical Communications System (LDACS) and AeroMACS.
- Legal recording - Synchronised voice and radar recording and reproduction systems used for incident investigation and regulatory compliance.

=== Navigation (NAV) ===
ATSEPs support ground-based and satellite-augmented radio navigation aids:

- Terrestrial navigation aids - Instrument landing systems (ILS, Categories I–III), microwave landing systems (MLS), VHF omnidirectional range (conventional CVOR and Doppler DVOR), distance measuring equipment (DME), and non-directional beacons (NDB).
- Satellite navigation augmentation - Ground segments of global navigation satellite systems (GNSS), including ground-based augmentation systems (GBAS GAST-C and GAST-D) and satellite-based augmentation systems (SBAS, such as WAAS and EGNOS).
- Performance-based navigation (PBN) - Infrastructure supporting area navigation (RNAV) and required navigation performance (RNP) specifications.

=== Surveillance (SUR) ===
Surveillance systems maintained by ATSEPs provide real-time situational awareness and aircraft separation:

- Primary surveillance - Primary surveillance radar (PSR) for terminal and en-route coverage, 3D surveillance radars, and surface movement radar (SMR) for airport surface operations.
- Secondary surveillance - Secondary surveillance radar (SSR Mode A/C and Mode S monopulse radars) and airborne transponder interrogation management.
- Cooperative and broadcast systems - Automatic Dependent Surveillance–Broadcast (ADS-B Out, ADS-B In), Multilateration (MLAT), and Wide Area Multilateration (WAM).
- Surveillance data distribution - Data interchange protocols (such as EUROCONTROL ASTERIX) and surveillance data distribution networks.

=== Data processing and automation (DP) ===
ATSEPs manage the hardware platforms, operating systems, and specialized ATM application software:

- Processing systems - Flight data processing systems (FDPS), radar/surveillance data processing systems (SDPS), multi-sensor trackers (e.g., ARTAS), and aeronautical information databases.
- Safety nets - Automated alerting logic including short-term conflict alert (STCA), minimum safe altitude warning (MSAW), and area proximity warnings (APW).
- Decision support and flow management - Arrival managers (AMAN), departure managers (DMAN), collaborative decision-making (A-CDM) interfaces, and trajectory prediction processors.
- Human-machine interface (HMI) - Controller working positions (CWP), touch input devices, graphic processors, and display consoles.

=== System monitoring and control (SMC) ===
SMC positions are centralized technical management nodes operating 24/7 within area control centres (ACCs) or flight information regions (FIRs). SMC ATSEPs oversee system health, manage degraded modes, coordinate planned equipment maintenance with air traffic control supervisors, manage system reconfigurations, and respond to sudden service disruptions.

=== Power and infrastructure ===
The availability of CNS/ATM facilities depends on dedicated electrical and environmental support infrastructure. ATSEPs manage and maintain high-reliability power systems, including uninterruptible power supply (UPS) arrays, diesel generator sets (GenSets), battery stations, power distribution boards, lightning protection, earthing networks, and specialized heating, ventilation, and air conditioning (HVAC) systems essential for electronic shelter environments.

== Regional variations ==
While "ATSEP" is the internationally accepted standard term defined by ICAO and Eurocontrol, several domestic civil aviation systems use alternative titles:

- In the United States, personnel performing equivalent functions within the Federal Aviation Administration (FAA) are primarily known as Airway Transportation Systems Specialists (ATSS).
- In India, ATSEPs working for the Airports Authority of India (AAI) were historically designated as Communication, Navigation and Surveillance Officers (CNSOs) or Air Traffic Electronics Engineers. They are represented by the Air Traffic Safety Electronics Personnel Association (ATSEPA India).
- In many Commonwealth jurisdictions and the United Kingdom, personnel are often referred to as "air traffic engineers" or "air navigation systems engineers".

== Professional representation ==
=== IFATSEA ===
The International Federation of Air Traffic Safety Electronics Associations (IFATSEA) is the global organisation representing national professional ATSEP associations. Following preparatory discussions in Brussels in November 1971, IFATSEA was formally inaugurated in Frankfurt, Germany, in October 1972 by representatives from ten European nations and Israel. IFATSEA holds consultative and observer status with ICAO, the European Union Aviation Safety Agency (EASA), and the SESAR Joint Undertaking.

=== International ATSEP Day ===
International ATSEP Day is observed annually on 12 November. The date commemorates the initial preparatory convention held in Brussels on 12–13 November 1971 that led to the founding of IFATSEA and international recognition of the profession.

== See also ==
- Air traffic control
- Air navigation service provider
- Avionics
- Communication, navigation and surveillance
- Systems engineering
