= SATA (disambiguation) =

SATA (Serial AT Attachment) is a computer bus primarily used for connecting storage disks.

SATA or Sata may also refer to:

== Airlines ==
- SATA (Swiss airline), a Swiss airline based in Geneva
- SATA Air Açores, a Portuguese airline based in the Azores
  - Sociedade Açoreana de Transportes Aéreos (Azorean Air Transport Company), predecessor of SATA Air Açores
  - SATA International, the former name of the Portuguese airline Azores Airlines

== Food ==
- Sata (food), a traditional dish from the Malaysian state of Terengganu
- Sata andagi, Okinawan name for sweet deep fried buns of dough native to Southern China

== People ==
=== Surname ===
- Genichiro Sata (born 1952), Japanese politician
- Ineko Sata (1904–1998), Japanese communist and feminist author of proletarian literature
- Michael Sata (1937–2014), politician and President of the Republic of Zambia

=== Other uses ===
- Sata Isobe (1944–2016), Japanese volleyball player
- Madame Satã, stage name of João Francisco dos Santos (1900–1976), Brazilian drag performer

== Places ==
=== Communities ===
- Sata, Kagoshima, a Japanese town now merged into Minamiōsumi
- Sáta, a village in Hungary
- Bannang Sata (town), in the Yala Province of Thailand

=== Geographical features ===
- Cape Sata, Japan
- Såta (Hemsedal), a mountain in southern Norway
- Såta (Stolmen), the highest point on the island of Stolmen, Norway
- Såta Nunatak, a nunatak (exposed ground or rock that is not covered by snow or ice) in Antarctica

== Published content ==
- 24 sata (Serbia), a newspaper founded in 2006
- 24sata (Croatia), a newspaper founded in 2005
- Madame Satã (film), a 2002 Brazilian–French drama film
- The Roads to Sata, a 1985 book by Alan Booth
- Sata Lota Pan Sagla Khota, a 2015 Marathi-language comedy film released in India

== Other uses ==
- SATA, a predecessor company of Tanfoglio, an Italian firearms manufacturer
- SATA, a brand of mechanics' tools from Apex Tool Group
- SATA, an assembly car plant based in Melfi, Italy
  - See it:Società Automobilistica Tecnologie Avanzate (in Italian)
- Sata, a Notoro-class oiler of the Imperial Japanese Navy

== See also ==
- Saida (disambiguation)
- Satan (disambiguation)
- Satay (disambiguation)
- Satta (disambiguation)
- Sayda (disambiguation)
