= Såta =

Såta may refer to:

- Såta (Hemsedal), a mountain in southern Norway
- Såta (Stolmen), the highest point on the island of Stolmen, Norway

== See also ==
- SATA (disambiguation)
