= Satta =

Satta may refer to:

== People ==
=== Surname ===
- Melissa Satta (born 1986), Italian television presenter
- Salvatore Satta (1902–1975)
- Sebastiano Satta (1867–1914), Italian poet, writer, lawyer and journalist

=== Given name ===
- Satta Sheriff (born 1998), activist

== Media ==
- Satta (album), a 2001 album by Boozoo Bajou
- Satta (2003 film), a Bollywood political drama film
- Satta (2004 film), an Indian Telugu-language action drama film

== Other uses ==
- Satta (spider), a genus of spiders in the family Lycosidae
- Satta gambling or Matka gambling, a form of betting and lottery in India
- Swiss Air Traffic Control Technical Association, the association of Swiss Air Navigation Service (ANS) technical professionals
- The Pali word for sattva, a sentient being in Buddhism
- Mount Satta and Satta Pass, in Shizuoka, Japan
