= System area code =

In air traffic control, the system area code (SAC) is part of a unique identifier assigned to each system which uses the ASTERIX format. The Eurocontrol SuRveillance Data Exchange Task Force (RDE-TF) maintains these identifiers internationally and assigns them to regions such as countries, though sometimes more than one code is assigned within the same country, for example to distinguish between civilian and military uses.

Within each country, it is the responsibility of the relevant air navigation service provider to allocate a system identification code (SIC); up to 256 of them for each SAC. (Note: EUROCONTROL (November 2000). "Surveillance Data Exchange - Part 1" (PDF). EUROCONTROL: 29–31.)

In the Asterix protocol the SAC/SIC identifies the actual sensor from where the radar information is sent. The information being e.g. plot and track.
