= Swiss Air Traffic Control Technical Association =

vodafone
- Swiss ATSEP Technical Association
- Founded: 1999
- Headquarters: Zurich, Switzerland
- Members: 126
- Key people: Stefan Boeller
- Website: www.satta.ch

Swiss ATSEP Technical Association (SATTA) is the association of Swiss Air Navigation Service (ANS) technical professionals a and member of IFATSEA (International Federation of Air Traffic Safety Electronics Associations). SATTA represents more than 120 professionals (ATSEP) from different companies spread over Switzerland.
