= Sayda =

Sayda may refer to:

- Sayda, Saxony, Germany
- Saida, Syria
- the Arabic name of Sidon

== See also ==
- Sayda-Guba (Sayda Bay), a rural locality in Murmansk Oblast, Russia
- Saydas (Salix Säydäş; 1900–1954), Tatar composer and conductor
- Saida (disambiguation)
