= Saida =

Saida may refer to:

== Places ==
- Saïda, Algeria, a city in Algeria
- Saïda Province, a province of Algeria
- Saida, Lebanon, the Arabic name for Sidon, a city in Lebanon
- Saida, a village in Helan, Mandi Bahauddin, Punjab, Pakistan
- Saida, Syria, a town in Daraa Governorate, Syria
- Seida, Tulkarm, Palestinian village in Tulkarm governorate
- Saida, a village in Barkote Block, Deogarh District of Orissa, India

== Other uses ==
- Saida (name)
- Saida, one of James Bond's allies in The Man with the Golden Gun
- Saida (crustacean), a prehistoric ostracod genus

== See also ==
- Sayda (disambiguation)
