= Satta cannibalorum =

Scientific classification
- Kingdom: Animalia
- Phylum: Arthropoda
- Subphylum: Chelicerata
- Class: Arachnida
- Order: Araneae
- Infraorder: Araneomorphae
- Family: Lycosidae
- Genus: Satta; Lehtinen & Hippa, 1979
- Species: S. cannibalorum

Binomial name
- Satta cannibalorum Lehtinen & Hippa, 1979

Species of spider

Satta cannibalorum is a species of spiders in the family Lycosidae. It is the only species in the genus Satta. It is found in New Guinea.

== Description ==
Satta cannibalorum was described based on a single male specimen collected on a kunai grass meadow. Its carapace measured 1.7 mm × 1.2 mm (0.067 in × 0.047 in) and abdomen 1.7 mm (0.067 in).
