= Airway Transportation Systems Specialist =

- FAA ATSS Repairing ASR-9 Radar Antenna

Occupation
- Occupation type: Professional
- Activity sectors: Aviation; Military

Description
- Competencies: Theoretical and practical knowledge of the principles of electronics, mathematics, computers, aeronautics, or related areas of automated systems operation, integration, management, and maintenance.
- Education required: FAA-based training and Certification by the FAA
- Fields of employment: Public and private sectors, both military and civil. Varies by country.

Airway Transportation Systems Specialists, also known as ATSS or FV-2101, are Systems Electronics Technicians assigned to the Technical Operations (TechOps) section of the Federal Aviation Administration's Air Traffic Organization (ATO). Airway Transportation Systems Specialists possess theoretical and practical knowledge in electronic theory and characteristics, functions, operations, and capabilities of a variety of National Airspace System (NAS) systems. Airway Transportation Systems Specialists ensure the safety and efficiency of the NAS by performing preventive maintenance, corrective maintenance, and system modifications of air traffic control systems at ATCTs, TRACONs, and ARTCCs throughout the United States of America and its territories. ATSS generally possesses years of experience in a variety of U.S. National Airspace System (NAS) systems. Airway Transportation Systems Specialists are responsible for the maintenance, operation, fabrication, installation, and management of the technical infrastructure of the National Airspace System. Airway Transportation Systems Specialists work at different Systems Support Centers (SSCs) in the United States. Airway Transportation Systems Specialists install, maintain, repair, operate, and monitor hardware and software to ensure they work as designed. ATSS certifies equipment and services to ensure safe and efficient flight operations throughout NAS. The FAA workforce currently includes 5,200 ATSS nationwide.

== ATSS Specialities ==
There are five Specialties under the Airway Transportation Systems Specialist job classification: Surveillance, Automation, Communication, Environmental, and Navigational Aids. An ATSS may specialize in one or multiple disciplines depending on the size and complexity of the air traffic control facility.

=== Surveillance ===
ATSS in the Surveillance specialty serves as a first-level Systems Specialist providing hardware and software support for all radar surveillance systems at designated SSCs to ensure safe traffic through the NAS. The Surveillance ATSSs are responsible for the operation and maintenance of short and long-range air and surface radars, secondary beacons, weather, and Global Positioning Satellite transceivers systems such as the Airport Surveillance Radar Model-9 (ASR-9), Terminal Doppler Weather Radar (TDWR), Mode Select Beacon System (MODE-S), Airport Surface Detection Equipment (ASDE-X), Next-Generation Radar WSR-88D (NEXRAD), and Automatic Dependent Surveillance–Broadcast (ADS-B).

=== Automation ===
ATSSs working in the Automation specialty are tasked with the maintenance, modification, and operation of the computer workstations, displays, and associated network equipment, control workstations, and flight data processor used by Air Traffic Control Specialist to the safely, orderly, and efficiently move aircraft through the NAS.

=== Environmental ===
The Environmental specialty is associated with operation and maintenance of the physical plant itself, such as heating, ventilation and air conditioning, power conditioning and distribution, and lighting systems.

=== Communication ===
The Communications specialty includes radios, inter-facility phone systems, antennas and transmission towers and can include between-facility communications networks. Ground to Air Communication Systems, Telecommunications, and Facility Information Systems.

=== Navigational Aids ===
The Navigational Aids specialty encompasses operations and maintenance of equipment used for aerial navigation such as Variable Omnidirectional Radios (VORs), Distance Measuring Equipment (DME), and airport approach lighting systems.

== Education ==
Undergraduate and Graduate Education: Major study or at least 24 semester hours in any combination of the following: computer science, mathematics, electronics, physical sciences, information management, engineering, telecommunications, or other fields related to the position. ATSSs must undergo extensive specialized training at the Mike Monroney Aeronautical Center in Oklahoma City, Oklahoma.

== Competencies ==
Airway Transportation Systems Specialists must have theoretical and practical knowledge of the principles of electronics, mathematics, computers, aeronautics, or related areas of automated systems operation, integration, management, and maintenance.
