= Hyperbolic navigation =

Class of radio navigation systems

The three ground stations are Stations A, B, C, whose locations are known. The times it takes for a radio signal to travel from the stations to the receiver are unknown, but the time differences are known. That is, ${\displaystyle t_{A},t_{B},t_{C}}$ are unknown, but ${\displaystyle t_{A}-t_{B}}$ and ${\displaystyle t_{A}-t_{C}}$ are known. Then, each time difference locates the receiver on a branch of a hyperbola focused on the ground stations. The receiver is then located at one of the two intersections. Other navigation information can be used to determine at which intersection the receiver is located.

Hyperbolic navigation is a class of radio navigation systems in which a navigation receiver instrument is used to determine location based on the difference in timing of radio waves received from radio navigation beacon transmitters.

Such systems rely on the ability of two widely separated stations to broadcast a signal that is highly correlated in time. Typical systems broadcast either short pulses at the same time, or continual signals that are identical in phase. A receiver located at the midpoint between the two stations will receive the signals at the same time or have identical phase, but at any other location the signal from the closer station will be received first or have a different phase.

Determining the location of a receiver requires that the two synchronized stations be tuned in at the same time so the signals can be compared. This reveals a difference in time, corresponding to a relative distance closer to one station or the other. Plotting all the locations where this time difference may occur produces a hyperbolic line on a chart. To take a "fix", a second station pair is also tuned in to produce a second such curve. The two curves will normally intersect at two locations, so some other navigation system or a third measurement is needed to determine the exact location.

Hyperbolic location systems were first used during World War I in acoustic location systems for locating enemy artillery. The sound of a shell being fired was received by several microphones, and the time of reception sent to a computing center to plot the location. These systems were used into World War II. The first hyperbolic radio navigation system was the World War II-era Gee, introduced by the Royal Air Force for use by RAF Bomber Command. This was followed by the Decca Navigator System in 1944 by the Royal Navy, along with LORAN by the US Navy for long-range navigation at sea. Post war examples including the well-known US Coast Guard Loran-C, the international Omega system, and the Soviet Alpha and CHAYKA. All of these systems saw use until their wholesale replacement by satellite navigation systems like the Global Positioning System (GPS) in the 1990s. Satellite systems are also based on the hyperbolic principle.

== Basic concepts ==
=== Timing-based navigation ===
Consider two ground-based radio stations located at a set distance from each other, say 300 km so that they are nearly exactly 1 ms apart at light speed. Both stations are equipped with identical transmitters set to broadcast a short pulse at a specific frequency. One of these stations, called the "secondary" is also equipped with a radio receiver. When this receiver hears the signal from the other station, referred to as the "primary", it triggers its own broadcast. The primary station can then broadcast any series of pulses, with the secondary hearing these and generating the same series after a 1 ms delay.

Consider a portable receiver located on the midpoint of the line drawn between the two stations, known as the baseline. In this case, the signals will, necessarily, take 0.5 ms to reach the receiver. By measuring this time, they could determine that they are precisely 150 km from both stations, and thereby exactly determine their location. If the receiver moves to another location along the line, the timing of the signals would change. For instance, if they time the signals at 0.25 and 0.75 ms, they are 75 km from the closer station and 225 from the further.

If the receiver moves to the side of the baseline, the delay from both stations will grow. At some point, for instance, they will measure a delay of 1 and 1.5 ms, which implies the receiver is 300 km from one station and 450 from the other. If one draws circles of 300 and 450 km radius around the two stations on a chart, the circles will intersect at two points. With any additional source of navigation information, one of these two intersections can be eliminated as a possibility, and thus reveal their exact location, or "fix".

=== Absolute vs. differential timing ===
There is a serious practical problem with this approach - in order to measure the time it took for the signals to reach the receiver, the receiver must know the precise time that the signal was originally sent. This is not possible in the case of uncooperative signal sources (like enemy artillery) and until the 2000s, clock distribution was an unsolved problem until the widespread introduction of inexpensive GPS receivers.

In the 1930s, such precise time measurements simply weren't possible; a clock of the required accuracy was difficult enough to build in fixed form, let alone portable. A high-quality crystal oscillator, for instance, drifts about 1 to 2 seconds in a month, or 1.4×10^{−3} seconds per hour. This may sound small, but as light travels 300 million metres per second (190,000 miles per second), this represents a drift of 420 km each hour. Only a few hours of flight time would render such a system unusable, a situation that remained in force until the introduction of commercial atomic clocks in the 1960s.

However, it is possible to accurately measure the difference between two signals. Much of the development of suitable equipment had been carried out between 1935 and 1938 as part of the efforts to deploy radar systems. The UK, in particular, had invested considerable effort in the development of their Chain Home system. The radar display systems for Chain Home were based on oscilloscopes (or oscillographs as they were known at time) triggered to start their sweep when the broadcast signal was sent. Return signals were amplified and sent into the display, producing a "blip". By measuring the distance along the face of the oscilloscope of any blips, the time between broadcast and reception could be measured, thus revealing the range to the target.

With very slight modification, the same display could be used to time the difference between two arbitrary signals. For navigational use, any number of identifying characteristics could be used to differentiate the primary from secondary signals. In this case, the portable receiver triggered its trace when it received the primary signal. As the signals from secondary arrived they would cause a blip on the display in the same fashion as a target on the radar, and the exact delay between the primary and secondary easily determined.

=== Position fix ===
Consider the same examples as our original absolute-timed cases. If the receiver is located on the midpoint of the baseline the two signals will be received at exactly the same time, so the delay between them will be zero. However, the delay will be zero not only if they are located 150 km from both stations and thus in the middle of the baseline, but also if they are located 200 km from both stations, and 300 km, and so forth. So in this case the receiver cannot determine their exact location, only that their location lies somewhere along a line perpendicular to the baseline.

In the second example the receivers determined the timing to be 0.25 and 0.75 ms, so this would produce a measured delay of 0.5 ms. There are many locations that can produce this difference - 0.25 and 0.75 ms, but also 0.3 and 0.8 ms, 0.5 and 1 ms, etc. If all of these possible locations are plotted, they form a hyperbolic curve centred on the baseline. Navigational charts can be drawn with the curves for selected delays, say every 0.1 ms. The operator can then determine which of these lines they lie on by measuring the delay and looking at the chart.

A single measurement reveals a range of possible locations, not a single fix. The solution to this problem is to simply add another secondary station at some other location. In this case two delays will be measured, one the difference between the primary and secondary "A", and the other between the primary and secondary "B". By looking up both delay curves on the chart, two intersections will be found, and one of these can be selected as the likely location of the receiver. This is a similar determination as in the case with direct timing/distance measurements, but the hyperbolic system consists of nothing more than a conventional radio receiver hooked to an oscilloscope.

Because a secondary could not instantaneously transmit its signal pulse on receipt of the primary signal, a fixed delay was built into the signal. No matter what delay is selected, there will be some locations where the signal from two secondary would be received at the same time, and thus make them difficult to see on the display. Some method of identifying one secondary from another was needed. Common methods included transmitting from the secondary only at certain times, using different frequencies, adjusting the envelope of the burst of signal, or broadcasting several bursts in a particular pattern. A set of stations, primary and secondaries, was known as a "chain". Similar methods are used to identify chains in the case where more than one chain may be received in a given location.

== Operational systems ==
Meint Harms was the first to have attempted the construction of a hyperbolic navigation systems, starting with musings on the topic in 1931 as part of his master's examination at Seefahrtschule Lübeck (Navigation College). After taking the position of Professor for Mathematics, Physics and Navigation at the Kaisertor in Lübeck, Harms tried to demonstrate hyperbolic navigation making use of simple transmitters and receivers. On 18 February 1932 he received Reichspatent-Nr. 546000 for his invention.

=== Gee ===
The first operational hyperbolic navigation was UK's Gee, first used experimentally by RAF Bomber Command in 1941. Gee was used both for bombing over Germany as well as navigation in the area of the UK, especially for landing at night. Several Gee chains were built in the UK, and after the war this expanded for four chains in the UK, two in France, and one in northern Germany. For a period following the formation of the International Civil Aviation Organization in 1946, Gee was considered as the basis for a worldwide standard for navigation, but the VHF omnidirectional range (VOR) system was selected instead, and the last Gee chain was eventually shut down in 1970.

Gee signals from a given chain were all sent on a single frequency. The primary station sent two signals, the "A" signal that marked the beginning of a timing period, and the "D" signal which was essentially two "A"s to mark the end. In every period, one of the two secondaries would respond, alternating their "B" and "C" signals. The resulting pattern was "ABD…ACD…ABD…" A wide-band receiver was used to tune in chain and the output sent to the operator's oscilloscope. As the chains were closely spaced in frequency to allow them to be received by a single tuner, this sometimes resulted in the signals from several chains appearing on the display. To distinguish the chains in these cases, a second "A" signal, the "A1" or "ghost A", was periodically keyed in, and the pattern of flashing on the display could be used to identify the chain.

The operator initially tuned in their receiver to see a stream of pulses on the display, sometimes including those of other chains which were nearby in frequency. They would then tune a local oscillator that triggered the oscilloscope's trace so that it matched the clock at the primary station (which could, and did, change over time). Next, they would use a variable delay that was added to the local oscillators signal to move the entire display back or forth so one of the "A" pulses was at the very left side of the 'scope (the action is identical to the "horizontal hold" dial on an analog television). Finally, the speed of the trace across the display would be tuned so the D pulse was just visible on the right. The distance of the B or C pulse from the A pulse could now be measured with an attached scale. The resulting delays could then be looked up on a navigational chart.

The display was relatively small, which limited resolution, and thus the determination of the delay. A measurement accuracy of 1 microsecond was quoted, which resulted in an accuracy of the determination of the correct hyperbolic to about 150 meters, and when two such measurements were combined the resulting fix accuracy was around 210 m. At longer ranges, 350 miles for example, the error ellipse was about 6 miles by 1 mile. The maximum range was about 450 miles, although several long-range fixes were made under unusual circumstances.

=== LORAN ===
The US had also considered hyperbolic navigation as early as 1940, and started a development effort known as Project 3 that was similar to Gee. Only halting progress had been made by the time they were introduced to Gee, which was already entering production. Gee was immediately selected for the 8th Air Force and the Project 3 team turned their attention to other uses, eventually considering convoy navigation in particular.

The new concept relied on the use of skywaves to allow the pulses to be received over very long ranges. This produced considerably more complex received signals than with Gee's line-of-sight system, and was more difficult to interpret. With that exception, however, the two systems were very similar in concept, and differed largely in frequency selections and the details of the pulse timing. Robert J. Dippy, inventor of Gee, moved to the US in mid-1942 to help with details of the ground stations. During this time he demanded that an airborne version of the receivers be made, and should be interchangeable with Gee. The resulting system emerged as LORAN, for LOng RAnge Navigation, and the first chain of two stations went live in June 1942. LORAN became LORAN-A when the design of its replacement started, this was initially the LORAN-B concept, but eventually replaced by the very long-range LORAN-C starting in 1957.

LORAN eventually selected 1.950 MHz as its primary operating frequency. 7.5 MHz was selected for daytime use as an additional channel, but never used operationally. In comparison to Gee's 450 miles (720 km) range through air, LORAN had a range of about 1,500 miles (2,400 km) over water, and 600 miles (970 km) over land. Operation was generally similar to Gee, but only one of the secondary signals was displayed at a time. A fix required the operator to measure one delay, then the other, and then look up the resulting delays on the charts. This was a time-consuming process that could take several minutes, during which time the vehicle was moving. The accuracy was quoted as 1% of range.

LORAN used two methods to identify a chain. One was the operational frequency, with four "channels", as in Gee. The second was the rate at which the pulses were repeated, with "high", "low" and "slow" rates. This allowed for up to 12 chains in any given area. Additionally, the originally steady repetition of the pulses was later modified to create another eight unique patterns, allowing a total of 96 station pairs. Any given chain could use one or more pairs of stations, demanding a large number of unique signals for widespread coverage.

=== Decca Navigator ===
The Decca Navigation System was originally developed in the US, but eventually deployed by the Decca Radio company in the UK and commonly referred to as a British system. Initially developed for the Royal Navy as an accurate adjunct to naval versions of Gee, Decca was first used on 5 June 1944 to guide minesweepers in preparation for the D-Day invasions. The system was developed post-war and competed with GEE and other systems for civilian use. A variety of reasons, notably its ease-of-use, kept it in widespread use into the 1990s, with a total 42 chains around the world. A number of stations were updated in the 1990s, but the widespread use of GPS led to Decca being turned off at midnight on 31 March 2000.

Decca was based on comparing the phases of continuous signals instead of the timing of their pulses. This was more accurate, as the phase of a pair of signals could be measured to within a few degrees, four degrees in the case of Decca. This greatly improved inherent accuracy allowed Decca to use much longer wavelengths than Gee or LORAN while still offering the same level of accuracy. The use of longer wavelengths gave better propagation than either Gee or LORAN, although ranges were generally limited to around 500 miles for the basic system.

Another advantage is that it is easy to display the relative phase of two signals using simple electromechanical gauges. In contrast to Gee and LORAN, which required the use of oscilloscopes to measure the signal timings, Decca used a series of three mechanical pointers which were a fraction of the cost, took up less room, and allowed simultaneous examination of three signals. This made Decca both much less expensive and easier to use.

Decca had the inherent disadvantage that the signal could only vary by as much as 360 degrees, and that pattern repeated in a circle around the stations. That meant there were a large number of locations that met any particular phase measurement, a problem known as "phase ambiguity". Whereas Gee and LORAN fixed you in one of two locations, Decca fixed you to one in hundreds. As the ambiguous regions radiated away from the stations and had a finite width, these became known as "lanes".

Decca solved this problem through the use of an odometer-like display known as "decometers". Prior to leaving on a trip, the navigator would set the decometer's lane counter to their known position. As the craft moved the dial's hand would rotate, and increment or decrement the counter when it passed zero. The combination of this number and the current dial reading allowed the navigator to directly read the current delay and look it up on a chart, a far easier process than Gee or LORAN. It was so much easier to use that Decca later added an automatic charting feature that formed a moving map display. Later additions to the signal chain allowed the zone and lane to be calculated directly, eliminating the need for manually setting the lane counters and making the system even easier to use.

As each primary and secondary signal was sent at a different frequency, any number of delays could be measured at the same time; in practice, a single primary and three secondaries were used to produce three outputs. As each signal was sent on a different frequency, all three, known as "green", "red" and "purple", were simultaneously decoded and displayed on three decometers. The secondaries were physically distributed at 120 degree angles from each other, allowing the operator to pick the pair of signals on the display that were sent from stations as close to right angles to the receiver as possible, further improving accuracy. Maximum accuracy was normally quoted as 200 yards, although that was subject to operational errors.

In addition to greater accuracy and ease of use, Decca was also more suitable for use over land. Delays due to refraction can have a significant effect on pulse timing, but much less so for phase changes. Decca thus found itself in great demand for helicopter use, where runway approach aids like ILS and VOR were not suitable for the small airfields and essentially random locations the aircraft were used. One serious disadvantage to Decca was that it was susceptible to noise, especially from lightning. This was not a serious concern for ships, who could afford to wait out storms, but made it unsuitable for long-range air navigation where time was of the essence. Several versions of Decca were introduced for this role, notably DECTRA and DELRAC, but these did not see widespread use.

=== LORAN-C ===
LORAN-A was designed to be quickly built on the basis of Gee, and selected its operating frequency based on the combination of the need for long over-water range and a selected minimum accuracy. Using much lower frequencies, in the kHz instead of MHz, would greatly extend the range of the system. However, the accuracy of the fix is a function of the wavelength of the signal, which increases at lower frequencies - in other words, using a lower frequency would necessarily lower the accuracy of the system. Hoping for the best, early experiments with "LF Loran" instead proved that accuracy was far worse than predicted, and efforts along these lines were dropped. Several halting low-frequency efforts followed, including the Decca-like Cyclan and Navarho concepts. None of those proved to offer any real advance over Decca; they either offered marginally improved range, or better range but too little accuracy to be useful.

Gee and LORAN-A became possible due to the development of the oscilloscope – before this the accurate measurement of time was not possible. LORAN-C became possible due to the development of the low-cost phase-locked loop (PLL) in the 1950s. A PLL produces a steady output signal with the same frequency and phase as an input signal, even if that input is periodic or poorly received. In this case the important feature was that the PLL allowed the re-construction of a continuous signal from a number of short pulses. A system using PLLs could receive a single pulsed signal, like Gee, and then re-construct a continuous tone for phase measurement, like Decca.

Re-using the Cyclan transmitters, the US Navy started experiments with such a system in the mid-1950s, and turned the system on permanently in 1957. Numerous chains followed, eventually providing around-the-world coverage near US allies and assets. Although less accurate that Decca, it offered the combination of reasonable accuracy and long ranges, a combination that obsoleted almost all other systems then in use and led to their gradual withdrawal. LORAN-C remained in service well into the satellite navigation era, until GPS finally led to its shutdown on 8 February 2010.

In basic operation, measurement was a two-step process. The signals would first be tuned in and lined up on the screen in a fashion similar to Gee, with the position of the blips being used to produce a rough estimate of the location. This measurement was accurate enough to place the vehicle within a specific lane. The operator would then greatly magnify the display until they could see the varying signal within the blips, and then use phase comparison to accurately line up the timing.

At low frequencies and long ranges, it would be difficult to know whether you are looking at the current phase of the signals directly from the stations, or comparing one direct signal to one from a cycle ago, or perhaps one reflected off the ionosphere. Some form of secondary information is needed to reduce this ambiguity. LORAN-C achieved this by sending unique details in the pulses so each station could be uniquely identified.

The signal was started off when the primary broadcast a sequence of nine pulses, with the precise timing between each pulse being used to identify the station. Each of the Secondary stations then sent out its own signals, consisting of eight pulses in similar identifying patterns. The receivers could use the signal timings to select chains, identify secondaries, and reject signals bounced off the ionosphere.

LORAN-C chains were organized into the Master station, M, and up to five Secondary stations, V, W, X, Y, Z. All were broadcast at 100 kHz, a much lower frequency than earlier systems. The result was a signal that offered a daytime ground wave range of 2,250 miles, nighttime ground wave of 1,650 miles and skywaves out to 3,000 miles. Timing accuracy was estimated at 0.15 microseconds, offering accuracies on the order of 50 to 100 meters. In real-world use, the Coast Guard quoted absolute accuracy of 0.25 nautical miles (460 m), or better.

=== Omega ===
One of the last hyperbolic navigation systems to enter operational use was one of the earliest to be developed; Omega traces its history to work by John Alvin Pierce in the 1940s, working on the same basic idea as the Decca phase-comparison system. He imagined a system specifically for medium-accuracy global navigation, and thus selected the extremely low frequency of 10 kHz as the basis for the signal. However, the problem with phase ambiguity, as in the case of Decca, meant that the system was not practical at the time.

The primary problem was synchronizing the stations. Gee and LORAN stations were close enough that the secondaries could trigger when they heard the signal from the primary, but for a global system, the stations might not be visible to each other, especially when the atmosphere was not cooperative. The solution to this was introduced in 1955 in the form of the caesium atomic clock. These offered enough accuracy that they could be synchronized at their factory, shipped to the transmitter locations, and left running for years without the need to re-synchronize. Much development was needed before these became practical, but these issues were mostly solved by the 1960s.

This left one other problem; phase comparison systems of this sort are ambiguous and need some other system to resolve which lane they are within. This was also in the process of being solved through the development of inertial navigation systems (INS). Even early models from the late 1950s offered accuracy within a few miles, which was enough to determine the lane.

Experiments on the concept continued throughout the 1950s and 60s, in parallel with Decca's development of their almost identical DELRAC system. It was not until the 1960s, when ice-breaking ballistic submarines became a main deterrent force, that there was a pressing need for such a system. The US Navy authorized full deployment in 1968, reaching a complete set of 8 stations in 1983. Omega would also prove to be one of the shortest-lived systems, shutting down on 20 September 1997.

Omega stations broadcast a continuous-wave signal in a specific time-slot. The atomic clocks also ensured that their signals were sent out with the right frequency and phase; unlike previous systems, Omega did not need to have a primary/secondary arrangement as the clocks were accurate enough to trigger the signals without an external reference. To start the sequence, the station in Norway would initially broadcast on 10.2 kHz for 0.9 seconds, then turned off for 0.2 seconds, then broadcast on 13.6 kHz for 1.0 seconds, repeating this pattern. Each station broadcast a series of four such signals lasting about a second each, and then stood silent while other stations took their turn. At any given instant, three stations would be broadcasting at the same time on different frequencies. Receivers would select the set of stations that were most suitable for their given location, and then wait for the signals for those stations to appear during the 10 second chain. Calculation of the fix then proceeded in precisely the same fashion as Decca, although the much lower operating frequency led to much less accuracy. Omega's charts quote accuracies of 2 to 4 nautical miles.

=== CHAYKA ===
CHAYKA is the Soviet Union's counterpart to LORAN-C, and operates on similar principles and the same frequency. It differs primarily in details of the pulse envelopes. There are five CHAYKA chains distributed around the former Soviet Union, each with a primary and between two and four secondaries.

=== Alpha ===
Alpha, more correctly known by its Soviet name, RSDN-20, is essentially a version of Omega deployed in the former Soviet Union starting in 1962. The initial system used only three transmitters running roughly in a line in Krasnodar, Revda and Novosibirsk, the later being the primary station. In 1991 two additional stations came online at Khabarovsk and Seyda. The stations use frequencies between 11 and 14 kHz.

=== Satellite navigation systems ===
Two complicating factors for satnav systems are: (1) the transmitter stations (satellites) are moving; and (2) GPS satellite transmissions are synchronized with UTC (with a published offset), thus providing precise time. Item (1) necessitates that the satellite coordinates be known as a function of time (included in the broadcast messages). Item (2) enables satnav systems to provide timing as well as position information, but requires a more complex solution algorithm. However, these are technical differences from earth-fixed hyperbolic systems, but not fundamental differences.

=== eLoran ===
China deployed a nationwide eLoran network in 2024. In 2025 the UK announced work on a national eLoran network, previously having operated one but shutting down all but one site in 2015.

== Experimental systems ==
In 2023 a prototype navigation system was tested based on detection of muon subatomic particles coming with cosmic rays, which would work underground and underwater.

The National Association of Broadcasters has sponsored development of the Broadcast Positioning System (BPS) over ATSC 3.0 television signals as a time-transfer and positioning system.

== See also ==
- Pseudo-range multilateration
