= International Federation of Air Traffic Safety Electronics Associations =

Professional association

IFATSEA
- International Federation of Air Traffic Safety Electronics Associations
- Founded: 1972
- Headquarters: Podgorica, Montenegro
- Members: 20,000
- Website: www.ifatsea.org

International Federation of Air Traffic Safety Electronics Associations (IFATSEA) unites the professional associations of air traffic safety electronics personnel (ATSEPs) from around the world.

== Aims and objectives ==
The aims of the Federation, as defined in the constitution, are as follows:

1. To operate as a non-political Federation of Air Traffic Safety Electronics Associations;
2. To promote safety and efficiency in the international air navigation system.
3. To assist and advise in the development of electronics systems in order to maintain the safe, orderly and expeditious flow of air traffic;
4. To uphold a high standard of knowledge and professional efficiency among Air Traffic Safety Electronics Personnel;
5. To protect and safeguard the collective professional interests of Air Traffic Safety Electronics Personnel;
6. To consider mutually beneficial affiliations with other professional organisations.
7. To strive for a worldwide Federation of Air Traffic Safety Electronics Associations.

=== How these aims may be achieved ===
The aims and problems related to electronics for air safety are generally similar throughout the world. These aims and the solutions of the related problems can best be achieved by international cooperation, mutual understanding and exchange of ideas, informæion and experience. It is fitting, therefore, that, Air Traffic Safety Electronics personnel at all levels and of all nations should unite in a worldwide professional Federation which is based upon the principle of cooperation in all professional matters. Further, it must be emphasised that the Federation is independent of profit making or political motives, essential requirements for international co-operation.

=== Services and activities ===
In order that IFATSEA aims are achieved, the Federation closely co-operates with national and international organisations, authorities and institutions. They do this by closely cooperating with national and international aviation authorities, and as such are represented in a large number of bodies that are looking at the present and future developments in air traffic control.

== Inauguration ==
Following a series of person to person contacts over a number of years a meeting was convened in Brussels on 12 and 13 November 1971.

Attending the inaugural meeting were representatives from Austria, Belgium, France, Germany, United Kingdom, Ireland, Switzerland.

The meeting agreed that a draft Constitution would be presented to an inaugural Assembly to be held in Frankfurt in October 1972.

Ten countries were represented at the first Assembly. These were: Austria, Belgium, Denmark, France, Germany, Greece, Ireland, Israel, Switzerland and United Kingdom

The Assembly adopted the Constitution and the Federation had come into being with a membership of ten and a course of action was set in motion to make IFATSEA known, and to have as its primary object the recognition of Air Traffic Safety Electronics Personnel, by national and international bodies. It was decided that the achievement of these aims would best be served, by producing a journal and seeking the amendment of ICAO Annex 1.

Ten years after the setting up of IFATSEA, the membership had doubled and the federation was fully recognised as representing the interests of Air Traffic Safety Electronics Personnel by such bodies as, ICAO, International Labour Organization and EUROCAE. The association works closely with other Professional Associations for staff in the aviation sector, International Transport Workers' Federation (ITF), IFATCA and IFALPA.

After internal reorganization IFATSEA is registered in Montenegro in March 2023.

== Executive board ==
The executive board consists of the posts of President, vice President, Executive Secretary, Treasurer and four regional directors, each of whom serve a term of office of four years. Elections take place every two years with half of the posts being elected. At the 22nd Assembly on Cyprus, it was decided to cancel the titles 1st, 2nd and 3rd in connection with vice presidents, and only keep the titles vice presidents.

=== Subcommittees ===
The Federation consists of four subcommittee who are responsible for implementation of strategic deliverables between the general assemblies. These subcommittees are overseen by the Regional Directors. The subcommittees are as follows:

- ATSEP Women Committee (Director, Africa)
- Safety and Human Factors (Director, Asia-Pacific)
- ATSEP Competency and Training (Director, Americas
- Future Systems (Director, Europe)

A general change of names for the Standing Committees was decided at the Assembly 1986, for better recognition of the working areas.

== Membership ==
The membership includes 74 countries worldwide. The Association also offers Corporate membership.
