= Wide area multilateration =

Surveillance technology for airports

Wide area multilateration (WAM) is a cooperative aircraft surveillance technology based on the same time difference of arrival principle that is used on an airport surface. WAM is a technique where several ground receiving stations listen to signals transmitted from an aircraft; then the aircraft's location is mathematically calculated -- typically in two dimensions, with the aircraft providing its altitude. Aircraft position, altitude and other data are ultimately transmitted, through an Air Traffic Control automation system, to screens viewed by air traffic controllers for separation of aircraft. It can and has been interfaced to terminal or en-route automation systems.

== System performance ==
WAM provides performance that is comparable to secondary surveillance radar (SSR) in terms of accuracy, probability of detection, update rate and availability/ reliability. Performance varies as a function of the location of aircraft in relation to the ground sensors. WAM is adaptable to interrogation rates, output modes and output periods. Update rates and probability of detection can be tailored to various applications such as precision runway monitoring (PRM), terminal maneuvering area (TMA) and En-route surveillance. Interrogation rates can be reduced by passively processing replies to SSR or traffic collision avoidance system (TCAS) interrogations.

== Avionics ==
WAM operates with SSR Mode A/C, Mode S, and Mode S ES messages; no aircraft equipage change or mandate is necessary. For ADS-B equipped aircraft, WAM provides an ADS-B target report as well as a multilateration target report. WAM can complement ADS-B by providing transitional surveillance for non ADS-B equipped targets, and can be used for ADS-B validation.

== Integration into automation systems ==
WAM incorporates new ground station output formats specifically designed for WAM and ADS-B:

- ASTERIX CAT19 for WAM system status
- ASTERIX CAT20 for WAM reports
- ASTERIX CAT21 for ADS-B reports

=== Implementation considerations ===
The primary advantage of WAM is that it can be installed in mountainous terrain, where the line-of-sight propagation paths required for SSRs would be blocked. A second advantage is that, in many situations, its cost is lower than that of SSRs. Operational implementations include the U.S. Western Colorado and Juneau, Alaska, areas and the Innsbruck, Austria, region. It is reported that a WAM system has been installed in the Czech Republic. WAM systems are also used to verify aircraft altimeter accuracy in the U.S. and Europe.

==== Siting and installation ====
The design of a WAM system is dependent upon proper site selections. Below are some issues to consider when selecting sites:

- Accessibility (limited by terrain, weather, availability of power and communications, etc.)
- Availability of power/backup power, communications
- Site ownership: customer or local/state government owned sites may be preferred to commercial sites
- Environmental impact
- Available space
- Interference with other site equipment
- Site acquisition and preparation: leasing, permits, required construction, etc.
- Installation season (extreme weather, high snows, high seas)
- Accessibility during installation
- Special training (survival training for oil platforms, tower climbing)

==== Communications ====
Availability of communications is an important factor in site selection. Bandwidth, latency and reliability all need to be considered. In many cases, a dedicated network is not available. The system needs to rely on third party commercial communications such as local microwave networks, telecommunications provider, or satellite communications.
