= Såta (Hemsedal) =

Mountain in Norway

Coordinates: 62°47′N 7°11′E

Geography
- Location: Hemsedal, Buskerud, Norway

Såta is a mountain in Hemsedal municipality of Buskerud, in southern Norway.
