= ASTERIX =

Standard for exchange of air traffic data

ASTERIX (short for All Purpose Structured Eurocontrol Surveillance Information Exchange) is a standard for the exchange of air traffic services (ATS) information. It is developed and maintained by the European ATS organization Eurocontrol. ASTERIX is surveillance data format which is being adopted by the world users community as the universal standard in this domain today.

ASTERIX is an extensible standard with a number of different categories, each of which deals with one particular kind of information. These include target reports from surveillance sensors such as radars as well as processed information such as aircraft tracks and various system status messages. Each category defines a number of data items which can be transmitted in a message. Which of these items are transmitted is defined in a User Application Profile (UAP), usually the default UAP provided by the standard document for the category, but optionally a more specialised UAP negotiated between sender and receiver separately.

Each system/sensor using the ASTERIX data format is assigned a unique identifier composed of two 8 bit values, the System Area Code (SAC) and the System Identification Code (SIC). The ANSP selects the SIC, but the SAC is assigned globally to system operators by Eurocontrol (see external link).
