= Geostationary orbit =

Circular orbit above Earth's Equator and following the direction of Earth's rotation

Two geostationary satellites in the same orbit

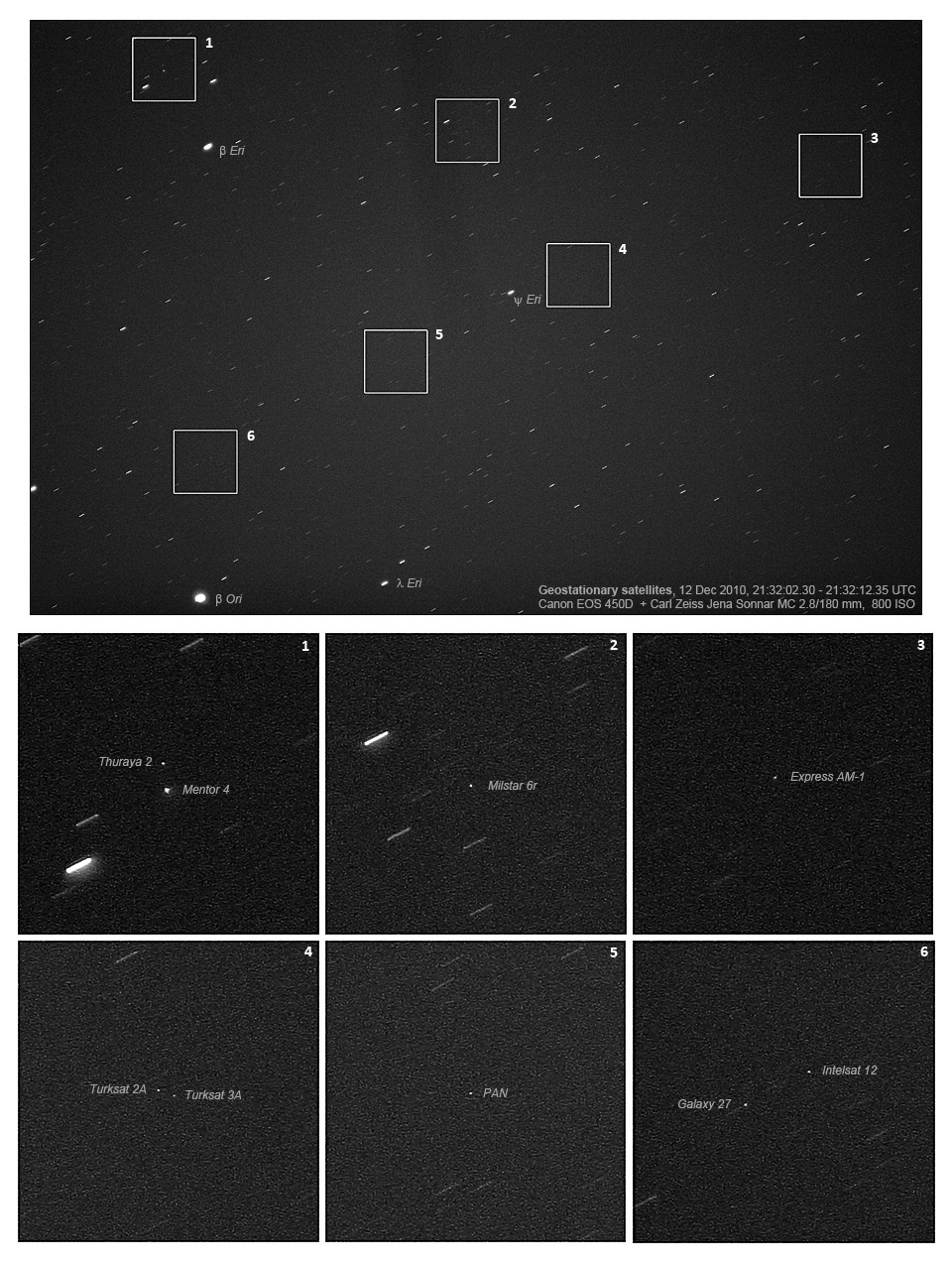
A 5° × 6° view of a part of the geostationary belt, showing several geostationary satellites. Those with inclination 0° form a diagonal belt across the image; a few objects with small inclinations to the Equator are visible above this line. The satellites are pinpoint, while stars have created star trails due to Earth's rotation.

A geostationary orbit, also referred to as a GEO or GSO, is a circular geosynchronous orbit 35,786 km (22,236 mi) in altitude above Earth's equator, 42,164 km (26,199 mi) in radius from Earth's center, and following the direction of Earth's rotation.

An object in such an orbit has an orbital period equal to Earth's rotational period, one sidereal day, and so to ground observers it appears motionless, in a fixed position in the sky. The concept of a geostationary orbit was popularised by the science fiction writer Arthur C. Clarke in the 1940s as a way to revolutionise telecommunications, and the first satellite to be placed in this kind of orbit was launched in 1963.

Communications satellites are often placed in a geostationary orbit so that Earth-based satellite antennas do not have to rotate to track them but can be pointed permanently at the position in the sky where the satellites are located. Weather satellites are also placed in this orbit for real-time monitoring and data collection, as are navigation satellites in order to provide a known calibration point and enhance positioning accuracy.

Geostationary satellites are launched via a temporary orbit, and then placed in a "slot" above a particular point on the Earth's surface. The satellite requires periodic station-keeping to maintain its position. Modern retired geostationary satellites are placed in a higher graveyard orbit to avoid collisions.

== History ==
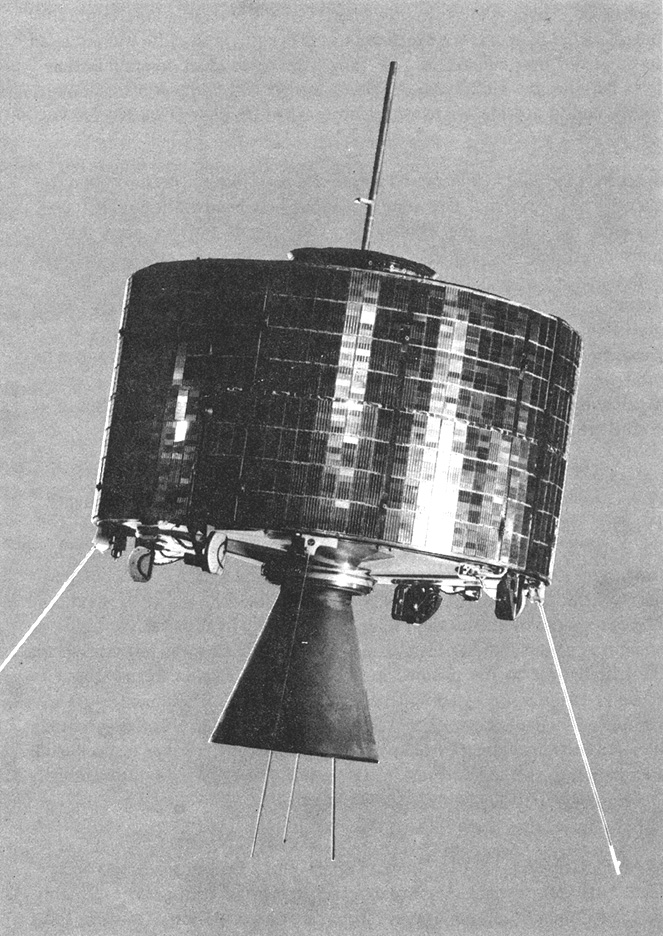
Syncom 2, the first geosynchronous satellite

In 1928, Herman Potočnik described both geosynchronous orbits in general and the special case of the geostationary Earth orbit in particular as useful orbits for space stations. The first appearance of a geostationary orbit in popular literature was in October 1942, in the first Venus Equilateral story by George O. Smith, but Smith did not go into details. British science fiction author Arthur C. Clarke popularised and expanded the concept in a 1945 paper entitled Extra-Terrestrial Relays – Can Rocket Stations Give Worldwide Radio Coverage?, published in Wireless World magazine. Clarke acknowledged the connection in his introduction to The Complete Venus Equilateral. The orbit, which Clarke first described as useful for broadcast and relay communications satellites, is sometimes called the Clarke orbit. Similarly, the collection of artificial satellites in this orbit is known as the Clarke Belt.

In technical terminology the orbit is referred to as either a geostationary or geosynchronous equatorial orbit, with the terms used somewhat interchangeably.

The first geostationary satellite was designed by Harold Rosen while he was working at Hughes Aircraft in 1959. Inspired by Sputnik 1, he wanted to use a geostationary satellite to globalise communications. Telecommunications between the US and Europe was then possible between just 136 people at a time, and reliant on high frequency radios and an undersea cable.

Conventional wisdom at the time was that it would require too much rocket power to place a satellite in a geostationary orbit and it would not survive long enough to justify the expense, so early efforts were put towards constellations of satellites in low or medium Earth orbit. The first of these were the passive Echo balloon satellites in 1960, followed by Telstar 1 in 1962. Although these projects had difficulties with signal strength and tracking, issues that could be solved using geostationary orbits, the concept was seen as impractical, so Hughes often withheld funds and support.

By 1961, Rosen and his team had produced a cylindrical prototype with a diameter of 76 centimetres (30 in), height of 38 centimetres (15 in), weighing 11.3 kilograms (25 lb), light and small enough to be placed into orbit. It was spin stabilised with a dipole antenna producing a pancake shaped beam. In August 1961, they were contracted to begin building the real satellite. They lost Syncom 1 to electronics failure, but Syncom 2 was successfully placed into a geosynchronous orbit in 1963. Although its inclined orbit still required moving antennas, it was able to relay TV transmissions, and allowed for US President John F. Kennedy in Washington D.C., to phone Nigerian prime minister Abubakar Tafawa Balewa aboard the USNS Kingsport docked in Lagos on August 23, 1963.

The first satellite placed in a geostationary orbit was Syncom 3, which was launched by a Delta D rocket in 1964. With its increased bandwidth, this satellite was able to transmit live coverage of the Summer Olympics from Japan to America. Geostationary orbits have been in common use ever since, in particular for satellite television.

Today there are hundreds of geostationary satellites providing remote sensing and communications.

Although most populated land locations on the planet now have terrestrial communications facilities (microwave, fiber-optic), with telephone access covering 96% of the population and internet access 90%, some rural and remote areas in developed countries are still reliant on satellite communications.

== Uses ==
Most commercial communications satellites, broadcast satellites and SBAS satellites operate in geostationary orbits.

=== Communications ===
Geostationary communication satellites are useful because they are visible from a large area of the earth's surface, extending 81° away in latitude and 77° in longitude. They appear stationary in the sky, which eliminates the need for ground stations to have movable antennas. This means that Earth-based observers can erect small, cheap and stationary antennas that are always directed at the desired satellite. However, latency becomes significant as it takes about 240 ms for a signal to pass from a ground based transmitter on the equator to the satellite and back again. This delay presents problems for latency-sensitive applications such as voice communication, so geostationary communication satellites are primarily used for unidirectional entertainment and applications where low latency alternatives are not available.

Geostationary satellites are directly overhead at the equator and appear lower in the sky to an observer nearer the poles. As the observer's latitude increases, communication becomes more difficult due to factors such as atmospheric refraction, Earth's thermal emission, line-of-sight obstructions, and signal reflections from the ground or nearby structures. At latitudes above about 81°, geostationary satellites are below the horizon and cannot be seen at all. Because of this, some Russian communication satellites have used elliptical Molniya and Tundra orbits, which have excellent visibility at high latitudes.

=== Meteorology ===
A worldwide network of operational geostationary meteorological satellites is used to provide visible and infrared images of Earth's surface and atmosphere for weather observation, oceanography, and atmospheric tracking. As of 2019 there are 19 satellites in either operation or stand-by. These satellite systems include:

- the United States' GOES series, operated by NOAA
- the Meteosat series, launched by the European Space Agency and operated by the European Weather Satellite Organization, EUMETSAT
- the Republic of Korea COMS-1 and GK-2A multi mission satellites.
- the Russian Elektro-L satellites
- the Japanese Himawari series
- Chinese Fengyun series
- India's INSAT series

These satellites typically capture images in the visual and infrared spectrum with a spatial resolution between 0.5 and 4 square kilometres. The coverage is typically 70°, and in some cases less.

Geostationary satellite imagery has been used for tracking volcanic ash, measuring cloud top temperatures and water vapour, oceanography, measuring land temperature and vegetation coverage, facilitating cyclone path prediction, and providing real time cloud coverage and other tracking data. Some information has been incorporated into meteorological prediction models, but due to their wide field of view, full-time monitoring and lower resolution, geostationary weather satellite images are primarily used for short-term and real-time forecasting.

=== Navigation ===
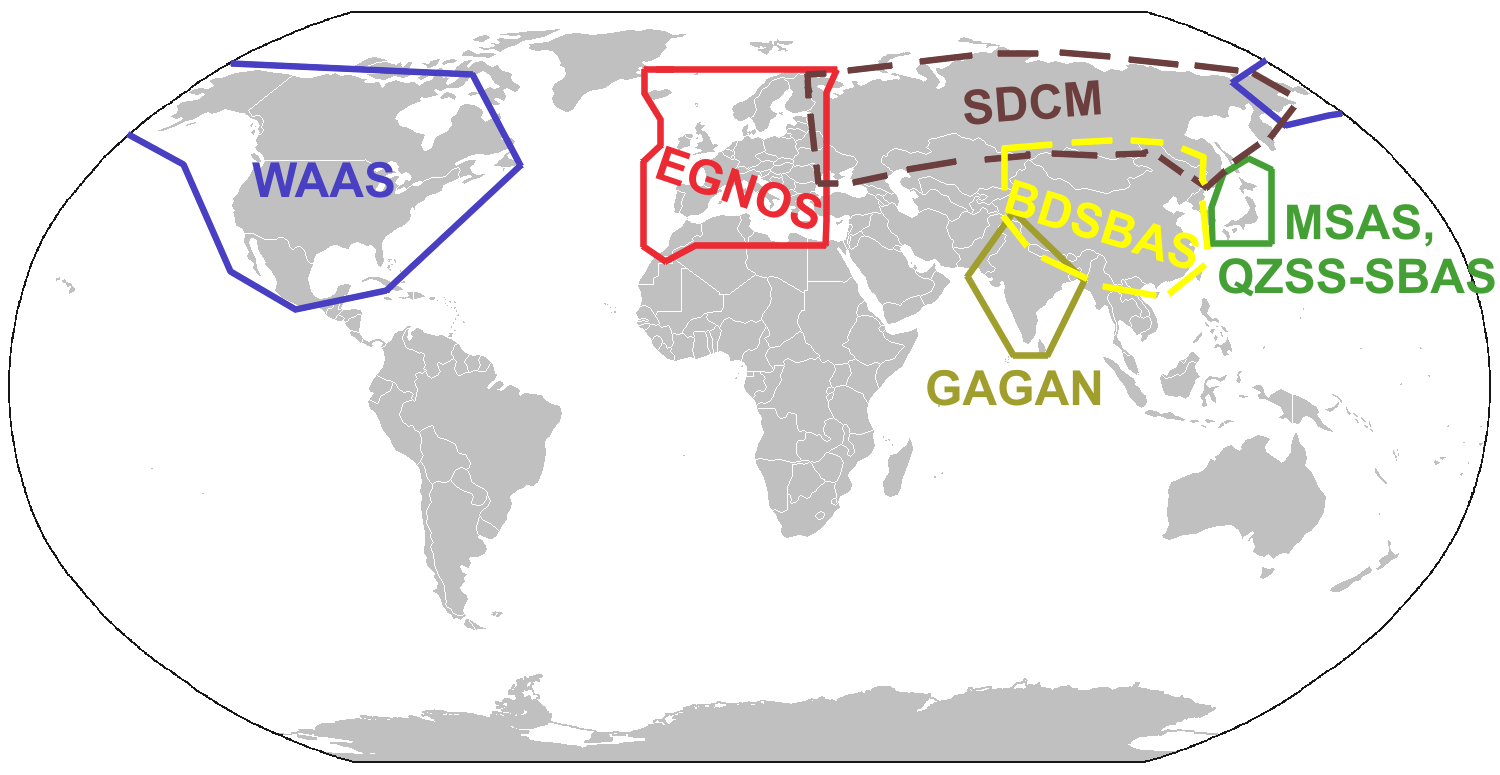
Service areas of satellite-based augmentation systems (SBAS).

Geostationary satellites can be used to augment GNSS systems by relaying clock, ephemeris and ionospheric error corrections (calculated from ground stations of a known position) and providing an additional reference signal. This improves position accuracy from approximately 5m to 1m or less.

Past and current navigation systems that use geostationary satellites include:

- The Wide Area Augmentation System (WAAS), operated by the United States Federal Aviation Administration (FAA);
- The European Geostationary Navigation Overlay Service (EGNOS), operated by the ESSP (on behalf of EU's GSA);
- The Multi-functional Satellite Augmentation System (MSAS), operated by Japan's Ministry of Land, Infrastructure and Transport Japan Civil Aviation Bureau (JCAB);
- The GPS Aided Geo Augmented Navigation (GAGAN) system being operated by India.
- The commercial StarFire navigation system, operated by John Deere and C-Nav Positioning Solutions (Oceaneering);
- The commercial Starfix DGPS System and OmniSTAR system, operated by Fugro.

== Implementation ==
=== Launch ===
An example of a transition from temporary GTO to GSO.
EchoStar XVII · Earth.

Geostationary satellites are launched to the east into a prograde orbit that matches the rotation rate of the equator. The smallest inclination that a satellite can be launched into is that of the launch site's latitude, so launching the satellite from close to the equator limits the amount of inclination change needed later. Additionally, launching from close to the equator allows the speed of the Earth's rotation to give the satellite a boost. A launch site should have water or deserts to the east, so any failed rockets do not fall on a populated area.

Most launch vehicles place geostationary satellites directly into a geostationary transfer orbit (GTO), an elliptical orbit with an apogee at GEO height and a low perigee. On-board satellite propulsion is then used to raise the perigee, circularise and reach GEO.

=== Orbit allocation ===
Satellites in geostationary orbit must all occupy a single ring above the equator. The requirement to space these satellites apart, to avoid harmful radio-frequency interference during operations, means that there are a limited number of orbital slots available, and thus only a limited number of satellites can be operated in geostationary orbit. This has led to conflict between different countries wishing access to the same orbital slots (countries near the same longitude but differing latitudes) and radio frequencies. These disputes are addressed through the International Telecommunication Union's allocation mechanism under the Radio Regulations. In the 1976 Bogota Declaration, eight countries located on the Earth's equator claimed sovereignty over the geostationary orbits above their territory, but the claims gained no international recognition.

== Retired satellites ==
Geostationary satellites require some station keeping to keep their position, and once they run out of thruster fuel they are generally retired. The transponders and other onboard systems often outlive the thruster fuel and by allowing the satellite to move naturally into an inclined geosynchronous orbit some satellites can remain in use, or else be elevated to a graveyard orbit. This process is becoming increasingly regulated and satellites must have a 90% chance of moving over 200 km above the geostationary belt at end of life.

=== Space debris ===
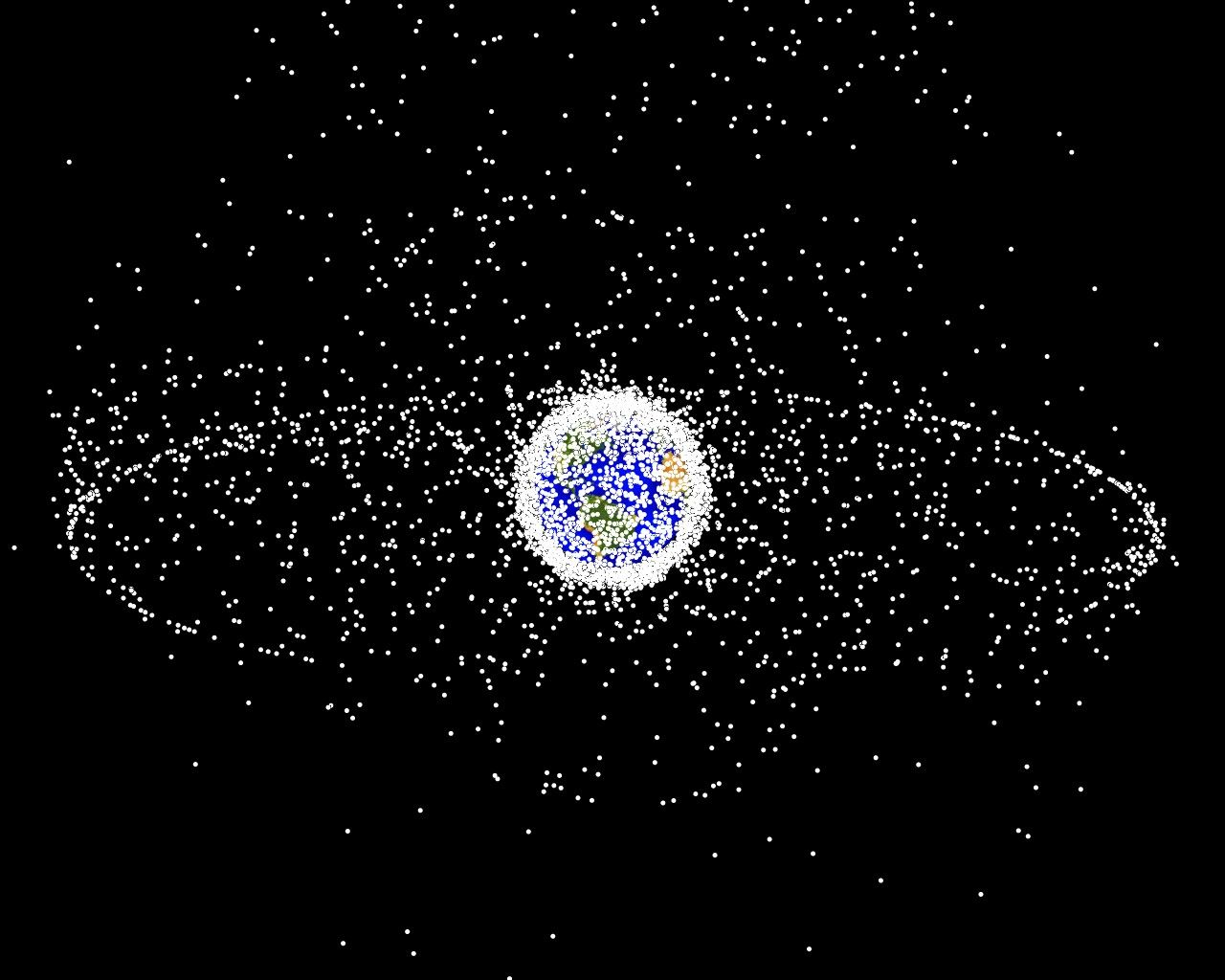
A computer-generated image from 2005 showing the distribution of mostly space debris in geocentric orbit with two areas of concentration: geostationary orbit and low Earth orbit.

Space debris at geostationary orbits typically has a lower collision speed than at low Earth orbit (LEO) since all GEO satellites orbit in the same plane, altitude and speed; however, the presence of satellites in eccentric orbits allows for collisions at up to 4 km/s (14,400 km/h; 8,900 mph). Although a collision is comparatively unlikely, GEO satellites have a limited ability to avoid any debris.

Debris less than 10 cm in size are very challenging to detect from the ground and are not regularly tracked, making it difficult to assess their prevalence.

Despite efforts to reduce risk, spacecraft collisions have occurred. The European Space Agency telecom satellite Olympus-1 was struck by a meteoroid on August 11, 1993, and eventually moved to a graveyard orbit, and in 2006 the Russian Express-AM11 communications satellite was struck by an unknown object and rendered inoperable, although its engineers had enough contact time with the satellite to send it into a graveyard orbit. In 2017, both AMC-9 and Telkom-1 broke apart from an unknown cause.

== Properties ==
A typical geostationary orbit has the following properties:

- Inclination: 0°
- Period: 1436 minutes (one sidereal day)
- Eccentricity: 0
- Argument of perigee: undefined
- Semi-major axis: 42,164 km

=== Inclination ===
An inclination of zero ensures that the orbit remains over the equator at all times, making it stationary with respect to latitude from the point of view of a ground observer (and in the Earth-centered Earth-fixed reference frame).

=== Period ===
The orbital period is equal to exactly one sidereal day. This means that the satellite will return to the same point above the Earth's surface every (sidereal) day, regardless of other orbital properties. For a geostationary orbit in particular, it ensures that it holds the same longitude over time. This orbital period, T, is directly related to the semi-major axis of the orbit through Kepler's Third Law:

$$T = 2\pi\sqrt{a^3 \over \mu}$$

where:

- a is the length of the orbit's semi-major axis
- μ is the standard gravitational parameter of the central body

=== Eccentricity ===
The eccentricity is zero, which produces a circular orbit. This ensures that the satellite does not move closer or further away from the Earth, which would cause it to track backwards and forwards across the sky.

== Stability ==
A geostationary orbit can be achieved only at an altitude very close to 35,786 kilometres (22,236 miles) and directly above the equator. This equates to an orbital speed of 3.07 kilometres per second (1.91 miles per second) and an orbital period of 1,436 minutes, one sidereal day. This ensures that the satellite will match the Earth's rotational period and has a stationary footprint on the ground. All geostationary satellites have to be located on this ring.

A combination of lunar gravity, solar gravity, and the flattening of the Earth at its poles causes a precession motion of the orbital plane of any geostationary object, with an orbital period of about 53 years and an initial inclination gradient of about 0.85° per year, achieving a maximal inclination of 15° after 26.5 years. To correct for this perturbation, regular orbital stationkeeping maneuvers are necessary, amounting to a delta-v of approximately 50 m/s per year.

A second effect to be taken into account is the longitudinal drift, caused by the asymmetry of the Earth – the equator is slightly elliptical (equatorial eccentricity). There are two stable equilibrium points sometimes called "gravitational wells" (at 75.3°E and 108°W) and two corresponding unstable points (at 165.3°E and 14.7°W). Any geostationary object placed between the equilibrium points would (without any action) be slowly accelerated towards the stable equilibrium position, causing a periodic longitude variation. The correction of this effect requires station-keeping maneuvers with a maximal delta-v of about 2 m/s per year, depending on the desired longitude.

Solar wind and radiation pressure also exert small forces on satellites: over time, these cause them to slowly drift away from their prescribed orbits.

In the absence of servicing missions from the Earth or a renewable propulsion method, the consumption of thruster propellant for station-keeping places a limitation on the lifetime of the satellite. Hall-effect thrusters, which are currently in use, have the potential to prolong the service life of a satellite by providing high-efficiency electric propulsion.

== Derivation ==
Comparison of geostationary Earth orbit with GPS, GLONASS, Galileo and Compass (medium Earth orbit) satellite navigation system orbits with the International Space Station, Hubble Space Telescope and Iridium constellation orbits, and the nominal size of the Earth. (Note: Orbital periods and speeds are calculated using the relations 4π^{2}R^{3} = T^{2}GM and V^{2}R = GM, where R is the radius of orbit in metres; T, the orbital period in seconds; V, the orbital speed in m/s; G, the gravitational constant ≈ 6.673×10^{−11} Nm^{2}/kg^{2}; M, the mass of Earth ≈ 5.98×10^{24} kg.) The Moon's orbit is around 9 times larger (in radius and length) than geostationary orbit. (Note: The Moon's orbit is not perfectly circular, and is approximately 8.6 times further away from the Earth than the geostationary ring when the Moon is at perigee (363 104 km ÷ 42 164 km) and 9.6 times further away when the Moon is at apogee (405,696 km ÷ 42,164 km).)

For circular orbits around a body, the centripetal force required to maintain the orbit (F_{c}) is equal to the gravitational force acting on the satellite (F_{g}):

$$F_\text{c} = F_\text{g}$$

From Isaac Newton's universal law of gravitation,

$$F_\text{g} = G \frac{M_\text{E} m_\text{s}}{r^2}$$,

where F_{g} is the gravitational force acting between two objects, M_{E} is the mass of the Earth, 5.9736×10^{24} kg, m_{s} is the mass of the satellite, r is the distance between the centers of their masses, and G is the gravitational constant, (6.67428±0.00067)×10^{−11} m^{3} kg^{−1} s^{−2}.

The magnitude of the acceleration, a, of a body moving in a circle is given by:

$$a = \frac{v^2}{r}$$

where v is the magnitude of the velocity (i.e. the speed) of the satellite. From Newton's second law of motion, the centripetal force F_{c} is given by:

$F_\text{c} = m_\text{s}\frac{v^2}{r}$.

As F_{c} = F_{g},

$$m_\text{s}\frac{v^2}{r} = G \frac{M_\text{E} m_\text{s}}{r^2}$$,

so that

$$v^2 = G \frac{M_\text{E}}{r}$$

Replacing v with the equation for the speed of an object moving around a circle produces:

$$\left(\frac{2\pi r}{T}\right)^2  = G \frac{M_\text{E}}{r}$$

where T is the orbital period (i.e. one sidereal day), and is equal to 86164.09054 s. This gives an equation for r:

$$r = \sqrt[3]{\frac{GM_\text{E} T^2}{4\pi^2}}$$

The product GM_{E} is known with much greater precision than either factor alone; it is known as the geocentric gravitational constant μ = 398600.4418±0.0008 km^{3} s^{−2}. Hence

$$r = \sqrt[3]{\frac{\mu T^2}{4\pi^2}}$$

The resulting orbital radius is 42,164 kilometres (26,199 miles). Subtracting the Earth's equatorial radius, 6,378 kilometres (3,963 miles), gives the altitude of 35,786 kilometres (22,236 miles).

The orbital speed is calculated by multiplying the angular speed by the orbital radius:

$$v = \omega r  \quad  \approx 3074.6~\text{m/s}$$

== In other planets ==
By the same method, we can determine the orbital altitude for any similar pair of bodies, including the areostationary orbit of an object in relation to Mars, if it is assumed that it is spherical (which it is not entirely). The gravitational constant GM (μ) for Mars has the value of 42830 km^{3} s^{−2}, its equatorial radius is 3389.50 km and the known rotational period (T) of the planet is 1.02595676 Earth days (88642.66 s). Using these values, Mars' orbital altitude is equal to 17039 km.

== See also ==
- List of orbits
- List of satellites in geosynchronous orbit
- Orbital station-keeping
- Space elevator, which ultimately reaches to and beyond a geostationary orbit
