= GPS meteorology =

GPS meteorology refers to the use of the effect of the atmosphere on the propagation of the Global Positioning System's (GPS) radio signals to derive information on the state of the (lower, neutral) atmosphere.

There are currently two main operational techniques in use in GPS meteorology: GPS limb sounding from orbit, and GPS water vapour monitoring.

== Ground-based ==
As a result, if it is possible to determine the total atmospheric delay by GPS, one can subtract out the calculated contribution by the well-mixed "dry" gasses from the measured air pressure at the surface, and obtain a measure for the absolute water vapour content of the atmosphere, integrated from surface to space. This is also referred to as "total precipitable water vapour".

What makes it possible to determine the total atmospheric delay, is its known dependence of the zenith or elevation angle of the satellite. If $z$ is the zenith angle, the propagation path delay is proportional to $\frac{1}{\cos z}$. This unique signature makes it possible to solve separately for the zenith delay in GPS computations also solving for station coordinates and receiver clock delays.

Nowadays water vapour estimates are generated routinely in real time (latency measured in hours) by permanent geodetic GPS networks existing in many parts of the world.

Water vapour is a very important gas for meteorological and climatological studies, because of the latent heat it carries in transport. Additionally it is a powerful greenhouse gas. The GPS technique is especially valuable because it measures absolute water vapour content or partial pressure rather than relative humidity, which corresponds to water vapour contents that are strongly dependent on the often not precisely known temperature.

== Space-based ==
One can receive on a low flying satellite the signals from the much higher orbiting (20 000 km) GPS satellite constellation. As the low flying satellite orbits the Earth in 1.5 hours, many of the GPS satellites will "rise" and "set" during the time of the orbit. When they do, their signal will traverse the atmosphere.

A signal delay is produced which grows or decays exponentially with time, just as the atmospheric density is an exponential function of height above the Earth's surface. In fact, this so-called limb sounding technique allows us to determine the scale height, the constant describing the steepness of this atmospheric density decay. This makes the technique extremely valuable for climatological studies, as the scale height is directly related to the temperature in the upper atmosphere, where the limb sounding signals do their sensing. The technique works best in the lower stratosphere and upper troposphere; it breaks down close to the Earth surface especially in the tropics, due to water vapour extinction.

Satellites involved in GPS limb sounding have been: METSAT, OERSTED (Danish), and several others.

== See also ==
- Error analysis for the Global Positioning System

== Links and references ==
- GPS meteorology
