= Acer Liquid Z630 =

Smartphone manufactured by Acer Inc.

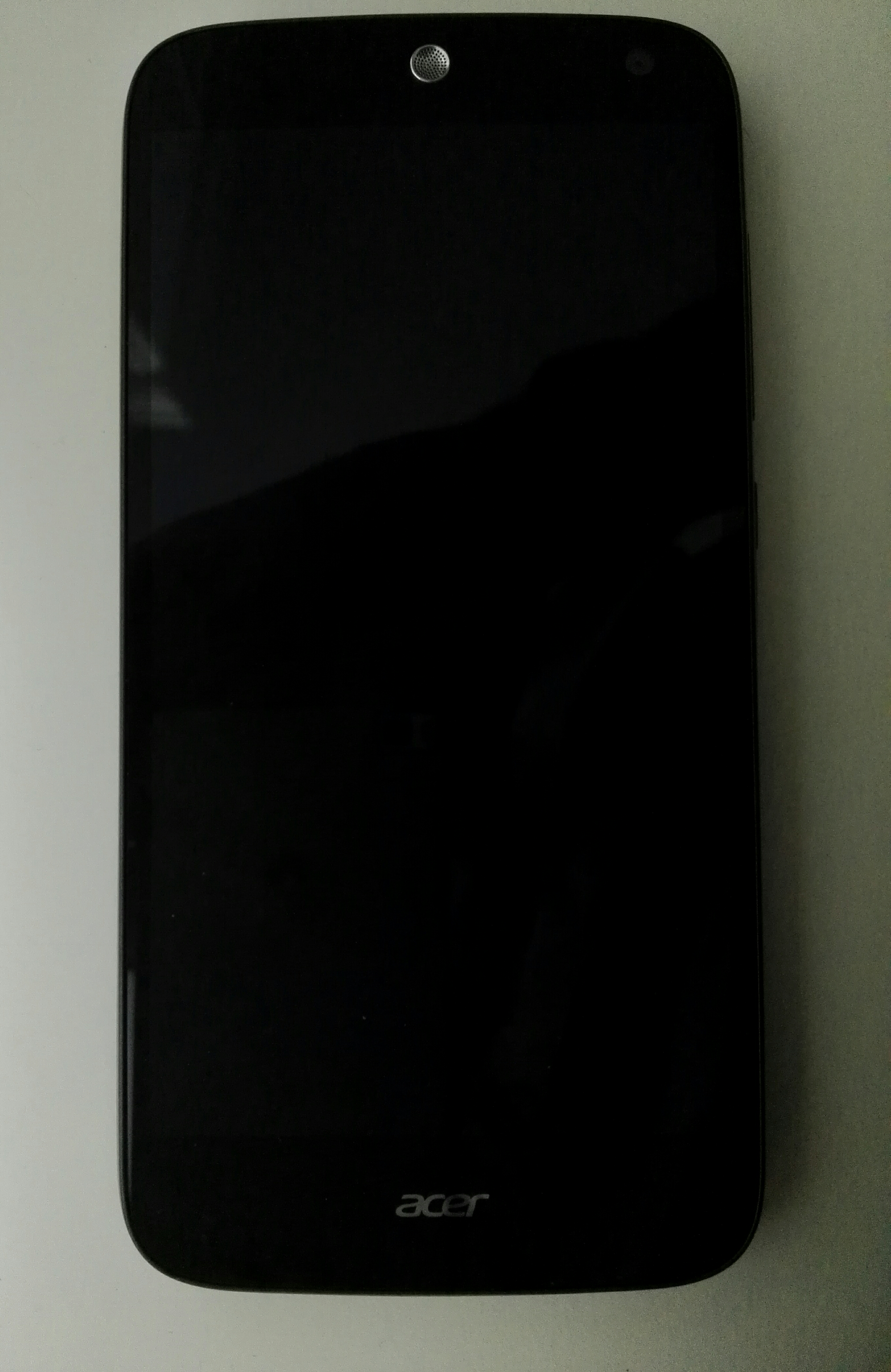
- Manufacturer: Acer Inc.
- Type: Smartphone
- Series: Acer Liquid
- Availability by region: September 2015
- Related: Liquid Z530, Liquid Jade
- Compatible networks: GSM/GPRS/EDGE; HSPA+ HSUPA; 4G LTE (1800/2100 MHz), UE Cat 4); Wi-Fi
- Form factor: Slate
- Dimensions: 156.3 mm (6.15 in) H 77.5 mm (3.05 in) W 8.9 mm (0.35 in) D
- Weight: 165 g (5.8 oz) (battery included)
- Operating system: Android 5.1 "Lollipop"
- System-on-chip: MediaTek MT6735
- CPU: Quad-core 1.3 GHz ARM Cortex-A53, 64-bit
- GPU: Mali-T720 MP2 600 MHz
- Memory: 2 GB RAM
- Storage: 16GB
- Removable storage: microSD, up to 32GB
- Battery: Li-Ion 4000 mAh, user replaceable.
- Rear camera: 8 MP (3264×2448 pixels), Led flash, autofocus, geo-tagging, face detection, HDR, light sensor, proximity sensor, panorama 1080p Full HD video recording 30fps
- Front camera: 8 MP
- Display: 5.5" IPS LCD HD Zero Air Gap, capacitive touchscreen; 720x1280 (921,600 pixels) 16,777,216 colors (267ppi)
- Connectivity: List: Wi-Fi :802.11 b/g/n/ac (2.4 & 5GHz); Wi-Fi-based positioning system (WPS); GPS/GLONASS; SA-GPS; NFC; Bluetooth 4.0; Micro-USB 2.0
- Other: Acer QuickMode user interface, Acer BluelightShield, Acer Identifier, DTS Sound, Album art cover, Background playback, Accelerometer

The Acer Liquid Z630 is a touchscreen smartphone developed and marketed by Acer Inc. It was announced in the September 2015 IFA exhibition in Berlin.

== Features ==
The Acer Liquid Z630 mt6735 (64bit) smartphone is powered by Android 5.1 Lollipop. It also enjoys an overlay software developed by Acer itself. When first firing, it needs to be configured in particular as regards security. For example, it is possible to protect the mobile preventing others from using the device without permission with the insertion of a pattern, a PIN or password.

With Acer Identifier, it is possible to obtain some services such as receiving updates, retrieve the applications already installed on other devices and access to customer service.

In standby, the smartphone is able to recognize simple gestures. Drawing a 'C' allows direct access to the Camera application, drawing a 'V' starts the application phone while 'Z' starts the music player.
