= SDCM =

SDCM can refer to:

- Standard deviation colour matching: see MacAdam ellipse
- System for Differential Corrections and Monitoring, a Russian satellite navigation augmentation system
- Sete Povos Airfield, an airfield in Brazil with ICAO code SDCM
