= Michibiki Satellite-based Augmentation Service =

Japanese satellite based augmentation system

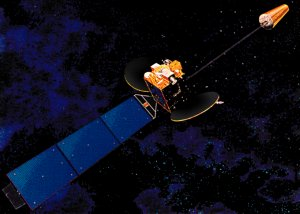
Artist’s rendering of MSAT-1

Michibiki Satellite-based Augmentation Service (MSAS), formerly Multi-functional Satellite Augmentation System, is a Japanese satellite based augmentation system (SBAS), i.e. a satellite navigation system which supplements the GPS system by reporting (then improving) on the reliability and accuracy of those signals. MSAS is operated by Japan's Ministry of Land, Infrastructure and Transport and Civil Aviation Bureau (JCAB). MSAS was commissioned for aviation use on 27 September 2007.

The use of SBASs, such as MSAS, enables an individual GPS receiver to correct its own position, offering a much greater accuracy. Typically GPS signal accuracy is improved from some 20 meters to approximately 1.5–2 meters in both the horizontal and vertical dimensions.

MSAS provides a similar service to Wide Area Augmentation System (WAAS) in North America, European Geostationary Navigation Overlay Service (EGNOS) in Europe and System for Differential Corrections and Monitoring (SDCM) in Russia. It uses the L1 band which most GPS receivers uses.

== Versions ==
MSAS has three versions so far. Version 1 (2007–2020) used two Multi-Functional Transport Satellites (MTSATs) and 8 ground stations. It removed the need of receiver autonomous integrity monitoring (RAIM) check. It offered ENROUTE-NPA level service.

MSAS Version 1
| Satellite Name & Details | NMEA / PRN | Location | Launched |
|---|---|---|---|
| MTSAT-1R (Himawari 6) | NMEA #42 / PRN #129 | 140°E | 26 February 2005 |
| MTSAT-2 (Himawari 7) | NMEA #50 / PRN #137 | 145°E | 18 February 2006 |

MSAS Version 2 entered operation in 2020. It uses a geosynchronous (GEO) satellite of the Quasi-Zenith Satellite System (QZSS) (PRN# 137) and 13 ground stations. It enabled LPV250 procedures. It achieves LPV200 over the Japan home islands, Chichi jima, and the Korean peninsula.

MSAS Version 3 entered operation in 2025. It uses three GEO satellites of the QZSS (PRN# 129, 137, 139), 15 ground monitoring stations, and 11 ionosphere monitoring stations. It had two master control stations. It is designed for LPV200 and is currently able to achieve it over the home islands, the Korean peninsula, the Ryukyu island chain, and Bonin Islands. On days of normal ionosphere activity it is able to provide LPV250 over Taiwan.

Future MSAS is intended to be switched over to a DFMC (Dual-Frequency Multi-Constellation) setup making use of Galileo, GPS, and QZSS on the L1/E1 and L5/E5 bands. Higher-bandwidth SBAS signal will be broadcast on L5 as opposed to the current L1. Correction messages will also be cryptographically signed to prevent spoofing.

== Data ==
The MSAS data format is described in ICAO SARPs Annex 10.
