= European Geostationary Navigation Overlay Service =

System that enhances the accuracy of GPS receivers

EGNOS
- Country/ies of origin: European Union
- Operator(s): EUSPA, ESA
- Type: Augmentation
- Status: Operational
- Coverage: Europe, North Africa

Other details
- Cost: €1,1 billion
- Website: EGNOS

Map of the EGNOS ground network

The European Geostationary Navigation Overlay Service (EGNOS) is a satellite-based augmentation system (SBAS) developed by the European Space Agency and Eurocontrol on behalf of the European Commission. Currently, it supplements GPS by reporting on the reliability and accuracy of their positioning data and sending out corrections. The system will supplement Galileo in the future version 3.0.

EGNOS consists of 40 Ranging Integrity Monitoring Stations, 2 Mission Control Centres, 6 Navigation Land Earth Stations, the EGNOS Wide Area Network (EWAN), and 3 geostationary satellites. Ground stations determine the accuracy of the satellite navigation systems data and transfer it to the geostationary satellites; users may freely obtain this data from those satellites using an EGNOS-enabled receiver, or over the Internet. One main use of the system is in aviation.

According to specifications, horizontal position accuracy when using EGNOS-provided corrections should be better than seven metres. In practice, the horizontal position accuracy is at the metre level.

Similar service is provided in North America by the Wide Area Augmentation System (WAAS), in Russia by the System for Differential Corrections and Monitoring (SDCM), and in Asia, by Japan's Multi-functional Satellite Augmentation System (MSAS) and India's GPS-aided GEO augmented navigation (GAGAN).

Galileo and EGNOS received a budget of €14.6 billion for its six-year, 2021–2027, research and development period.

== History and roadmap ==
The system started its initial operations in July 2005, with accuracy better than two metres and availability above 99%. Since then, EGNOS has been broadcasting a continuous signal. One of the first uses of system was to track cyclists in the Tour de France road race.

In 2009, the European Commission announced it had signed a contract with the company European Satellite Services Provider to run EGNOS. The official start of operations was announced by the European Commission on 1 October 2009. The system was certified for use in safety of life applications in March 2011. An EGNOS Data Access Service became available in July 2012.

By the mid 2010s, initial work to extend EGNOS coverage to the Southern Africa region was underway via a project called ESESA - EGNOS Service Extension to South Africa. The European Commission is defining the roadmap for the evolution of the EGNOS mission. This roadmap should cope with legacy and new missions:

- 2011–2030: En-route / NPA / APV1 / LPV200 service based on augmentation of GPS L1 only. The Safety of Life (SoL) will be guaranteed up to 2030 in compliance with ICAO SBAS SARPS.
- 2020+: It is planned that EGNOS will experiment with a major evolution, EGNOS V3, including the fulfilment of the SBAS L1/L5 standard, expansion to dual-frequency, and evolution toward a multi-constellation concept.

In 2021, following Brexit, the United Kingdom withdrew regulatory approval for EGNOS, and aircraft pilots were no longer permitted to use the system.

== Satellites and SISNeT ==
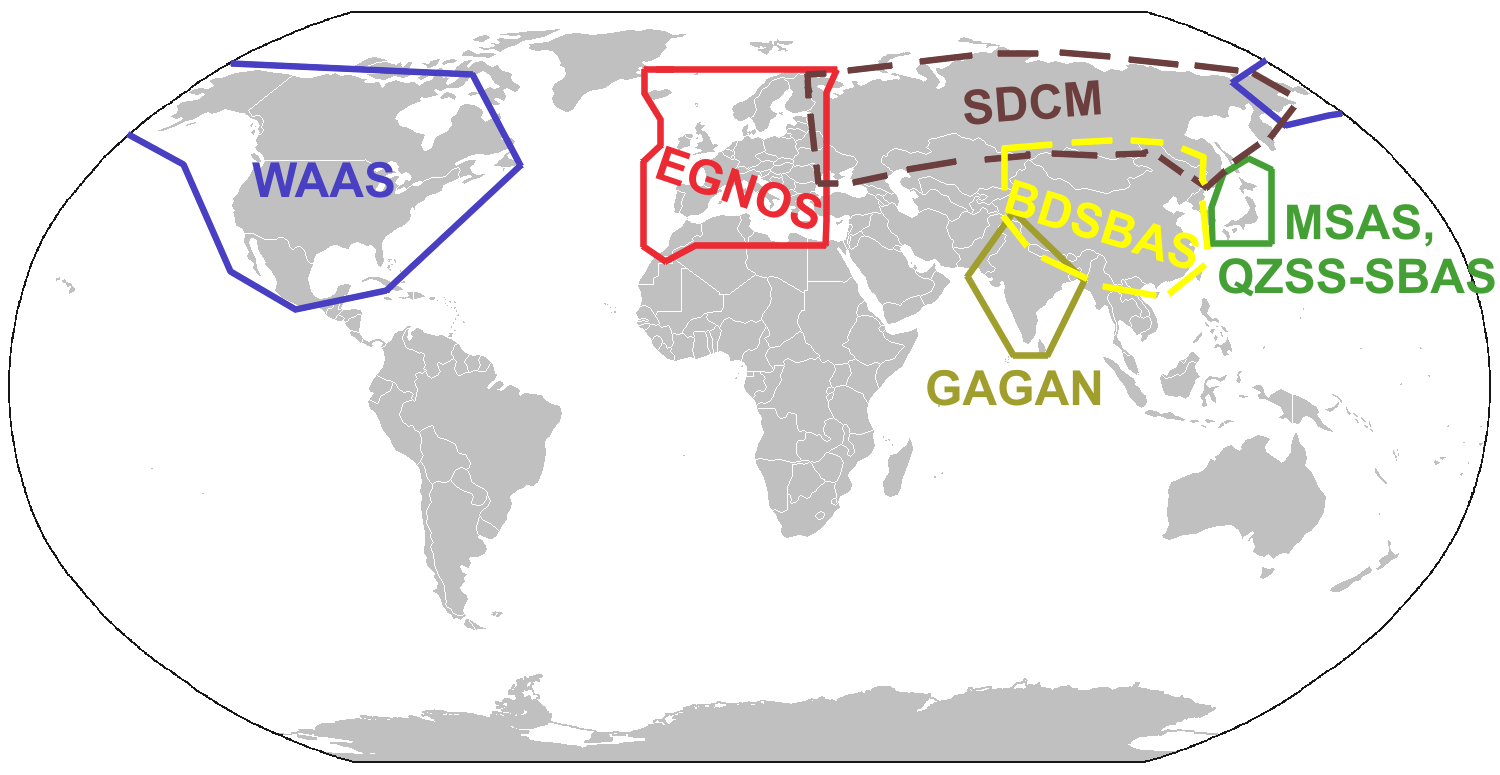
Service areas of satellite-based augmentation systems (SBAS)

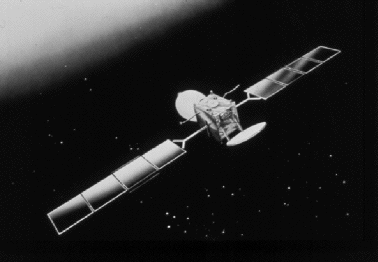
Inmarsat 3 satellite

Satellite Name & Details	NMEA / PRN	Signals	Location	Status
Inmarsat 3-F2 (Atlantic Ocean Region-East)	NMEA #33 / PRN #120	L1	15.5°W	retired
ARTEMIS	NMEA #37 / PRN #124	—	21.5°E	retired
Inmarsat 4-F2 (Europe Middle East Africa)	NMEA #39 / PRN #126	—	~~25°E~~ 64°E	removed
Inmarsat 3-F1 (Indian Ocean)	NMEA #44 / PRN #131	—	64.5°E	retired
SES-5 (a.k.a. Sirius 5 or Astra 4B)	NMEA #49 / PRN #136	L1 & L5	5.0°E	active
Astra 5B	NMEA #36 / PRN #123	L1 & L5	23.5°E	active (in test mode)
Eutelsat 5 West B	PRN #121		5°W	active

Similar to WAAS, EGNOS is mostly designed for aviation users who enjoy unperturbed reception of direct signals from geostationary satellites up to very high latitudes. The use of EGNOS on the ground, especially in urban areas, is limited due to relatively low elevation of geostationary satellites: about 30° above horizon in central Europe and much less in the North of Europe. To address this problem, ESA released in 2002 SISNeT, an Internet service designed for continuous delivery of EGNOS signals to ground users. The first experimental SISNeT receiver was created by the Finnish Geodetic Institute. The commercial SISNeT receivers have been developed by Septentrio. PRN #136 was placed into the Operational Platform from 23/08/2018 at 10:00 UTC and PRN #120 was placed into Test Platform from 30/08/2018 at 13:00 UTC.

== Services ==
- Open Service (OS): It improves positioning accuracy by correcting error sources affecting GNSS signals intended for a wide range of applications in various domains. The corrections transmitted by EGNOS help mitigate the ranging error sources related to satellite clocks, satellite position and ionospheric effects. EGNOS can also detect distortions affecting the signals transmitted by GNSS and prevent users from tracking unhealthy or misleading signals that could lead to inaccurate positioning. The service is available free-of-charge in Europe to any user equipped with an appropriate GPS/SBAS compatible receiver for which no specific receiver certification is required. It has been available since 1 October 2009.
- Safety of Life (SoL) Service: The main objective of the EGNOS SoL service is to support civil aviation operations down to Localizer Performance with Vertical Guidance (LPV) minima. However, the EGNOS SoL service might also be used in a wide range of other application domains (e.g. maritime, rail, road...) in the future. This service provides the most stringent level of signal-in-space performance to all Safety of Life user communities. The EGNOS system has been designed so that the EGNOS Signal-In-Space (SIS) is compliant with the ICAO SARPs for SBAS. It has been available since 2 March 2011.
- EGNOS Data Access Service (EDAS): EDAS is the terrestrial data service and offers ground-based access to EGNOS data in real time and also in a historical FTP archive to authorised users (e.g. added-value application providers). EDAS is the single point of access for the data collected and generated by the EGNOS ground infrastructure distributed over Europe and North Africa, it is aimed at users who require enhanced performance for commercial and professional use. It has been available since 26 July 2012.

== Architecture ==
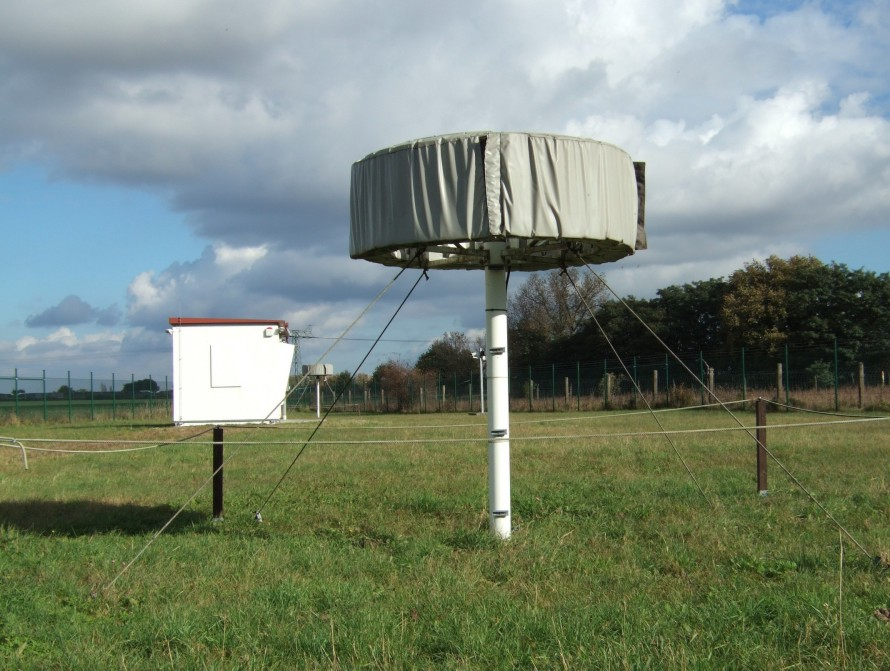
EGNOS RIMS "BRN" (Berlin) close to Berlin

EGNOS is divided into four functional segments:

1. Ground segment: comprises a network of 40 Ranging Integrity Monitoring Stations (RIMS), 2 Mission Control Centres (MCC), 2 Navigation Land Earth Stations (NLES) per Geostationary Earth Orbit (GEO), and the EGNOS Wide Area Network (EWAN), which provides the communication network for all the components of the ground segment.

- 40 RIMS: the main function of the RIMS is to collect measurements from GPS satellites and to transmit these raw data every second to the Central Processing Facilities (CPF) of each MCC.
- 2 MCC: these receive the information from the RIMS and generate correction messages to improve satellite signal accuracy and information messages on the status of the satellites (integrity). It acts as the "brain" of the system.
- 6 NLES: the NLESs (two for each GEO for redundancy purposes) transmit the EGNOS message received from the central processing facility to the GEO satellites for broadcasting to users and to ensure the synchronisation with the GPS signal.

2. Support segment: In addition to the above-mentioned stations/centres, the system has other ground support installations involved in system operations planning and performance assessment, namely the Performance Assessment and Checkout Facility (PACF) and the Application Specific Qualification Facility (ASQF) which are operated by the EGNOS Service Provider (ESSP).

- PACF (Performance Assessment and Check-out Facility): provides support to EGNOS management in the form of performance analysis, troubleshooting, and operational procedures as well upgrading specifications and validations and providing maintenance support.
- ASQF (Application Specific Qualification Facility): provides civil aviation and aeronautical certification authorities with the tools to qualify, validate and certify the different EGNOS applications.

3. Space Segment: composed of at least three geostationary satellites broadcasting corrections and integrity information for GPS satellites in the L1 frequency band (1575.42 MHz). This space segment configuration provides a high level of redundancy over the whole service area in the event of a failure in the geostationary satellite link. EGNOS operations are handled in such a way that, at any point in time, at least two GEOs broadcast an operational signal.

4. User Segment: the EGNOS user segment consists of EGNOS receivers that enable their users to accurately compute their positions with integrity. To receive EGNOS signals, the end user must use an EGNOS-compatible receiver. Currently, EGNOS compatible receivers are available for such market segments as agriculture, aviation, maritime, rail, mapping/surveying, road and location based services (LBS).

== Aviation ==
In March 2011, the EGNOS Safety-of-Life Service was deemed acceptable for use in aviation. This allows pilots throughout Europe to use the EGNOS system as a form of positioning during an approach, and allows pilots to land the aircraft in IMC using a GPS approach.

As of September 2018 LPV (Localizer performance with vertical guidance) landing procedures, which are EGNOS-enabled, were available at more than 180 airports across Europe.
