= Hemisphere GNSS =

Hemisphere GNSS, Inc.
- Industry: Technology Manufacturer
- Founded: 2013; 13 years ago
- Headquarters: Scottsdale, Arizona, United States
- Area served: International
- Key people: Farlin Halsey (President/ CEO)
- Services: GNSS-Based Positioning and Heading, Guidance & Navigation, Machine control, and L-band GNSS corrections
- Number of employees: 110+
- Parent: CNH Industrial (2023–present)
- Website: www.hemispheregnss.com

Hemisphere GNSS designs and manufactures precision global positioning system and global navigation satellite system products and technology for positioning, heading, guidance, navigation, machine control, and L-band correction service applications. Its products and technology are used in agricultural, marine, surveying, GIS mapping, and machine control markets.

Founded in 2013, it was created after Beijing UniStrong Science & Technology acquired Hemisphere GPS, which was subsequently renamed AgJunction. Headquartered in Scottsdale, Arizona, the company has product development facilities in Hiawatha, Kansas, Calgary, Canada, and Winnipeg, Canada.

Offered by Hemisphere, Atlas is a satellite-based augmentation system (SBAS) service whose correction signals are proprietary. Subscription can be purchased from them to receive a subscription authorization. To receive corrections from Atlas, the user must have a capable receiver available from the company.

In turn, Outback Guidance is a subsidiary of Hemisphere GNSS, developing and producing hardware and software for Precision agriculture solutions. Its terminals and its autosteer software are used as OEM equipment in Claas machines.

After announcing its intention to purchase it on March 30, 2023, CNH Industrial completed the acquisition of Hemisphere GNSS on October 12.

== Products ==
- Positioning
- Positioning and heading
- Peripherals
- Atlas GNSS-based global L-band correction service
