= OmniSTAR =

Satellite-based augmentation system service provider

OmniSTAR is a satellite-based augmentation system (SBAS) service provider. OmniSTAR correction signals are proprietary, and a subscription must be bought from the OmniSTAR corporation to receive a subscription authorization. OmniSTAR uses geostationary satellites in eight regions covering most of the landmass of each inhabited continent on Earth:

1. MSV-E, MSV-C, MSV-W (North America)
2. AMSAT (Central and South America and the Caribbean)
3. AORWH (Atlantic Ocean East Coast)
4. AOREH (Atlantic Ocean Europe/Africa)
5. EUSAT (Europe and Africa)
6. IORHN (Indian Ocean Region)
7. APSAT (Asia, Australasia, Western Pacific, Eastern Africa, Southern Africa)
8. OCSAT (Australia, New Zealand)

MSV service is provided by the MSAT AMSC-1 and MSAT-M1 satellites, operated by a company called Mobile Satellite Ventures.

To access the OmniSTAR solution the user must have an OmniSTAR-capable receiver. OmniSTAR capable receivers are available from a number of GPS manufacturers such as Autofarm, Geneq, Hemisphere GPS, NovAtel, Topcon, Trimble, and Raven.

The OmniSTAR service options include both single-frequency (L1 only) code phase DGPS solutions and dual-frequency (L1/L2) carrier phase solutions. Accuracy depends on satellite geometry, local conditions, receiver capability and other variables, but typically the L1-only solution (VBS - Virtual Base Station) yields horizontal accuracy of < +/1 meter > 95% of the time and the L1/L2 solutions (OmniSTAR HP, OmniSTAR XP or HP/XP combined) provide horizontal accuracies of < +/- 15 cm > 95% of the time.

XP makes use of precise orbit and clock corrections of the GPS Satellites. The data is bought from Nasa JPL G2 uses Orbit and Clocks calculated from Omnistar's own network of reference stations.

Motorola has an optical headend product line that once owned the Omnistar name.

== See also ==
- GNSS augmentation
