= Localizer performance with vertical guidance =

Aviation instrument approach procedures

Localizer performance with vertical guidance (LPV) are the highest precision GPS (SBAS enabled) aviation instrument approach procedures currently available without specialized aircrew training requirements, such as required navigation performance (RNP). Landing minima are usually similar to those of a Cat I instrument landing system (ILS), that is, a decision height of 200 feet (61 m) and visibility of 800 m. Lateral guidance (LNAV) using WAAS and GPS is equivalent to a localizer, and uses a ground-independent electronic glide path. Altitude calculation using WAAS at approved sites are equivalent to a VNAV. Thus the combination is similar to LNAV/VNAV, and the decision altitude (DA) can be as low as 200 feet. In the beginning LPV were commonly LPV-250, which had a 250-feet DA. LPV-200 with 200-feet DA entered into use in the late 2010s and early 2020s.

Examples of receivers providing LPV capability include (from Garmin) the GTN 7xx & 6xx, GNS 480, GNS 430W & 530W, and the post 2007 Garmin G1000 with GIA 63W. Various FMS models, GNSS receivers and FMS upgrades are available from Rockwell Collins (e.g.). Most new aircraft and helicopters equipped with integrated flight decks such as Rockwell Collins ProLine (TM) 21 and ProLine Fusion (TM) are LPV-capable. In 2014, Avidyne began equipping general aviation and business aircraft with the IFD540 and IFD440 navigators incorporating a touch-screen flight management system with full LPV capability.

LPV is designed to provide 25 feet (7.6 m) lateral and vertical accuracy 95 percent of the time. Actual performance has exceeded these levels. WAAS has never been observed to have a vertical error greater than 12 metres in its operational history. An LPV approach is classified as an approach with vertical guidance (APV) to distinguish it from a precision approach (PA) or a non-precision approach (NPA). SBAS criteria includes a vertical alarm limit more than 12 m, but less than 50 m, yet an LPV does not meet the ICAO Annex 10 precision approach standard.

As of September 17, 2015 the Federal Aviation Administration (FAA) has published 3,567 LPV approaches at 1,739 airports. As of October 7, 2021 the FAA has published 4,088 LPV approaches at 1,965 airports. This is greater than the number of published Category I ILS procedures. Outside of the United States, regulatory authorities use local SBAS services such as EGNOS and MSAS in place of WAAS to define LPV procedures.

== Related procedures ==
AC 90-107 (Guidance for Localizer Performance with Vertical Guidance and Localizer Performance without Vertical Guidance Approach Operations in the U.S. National Airspace System) describes LPV as a type of area navigation (RNAV). Analogous to the separation of LNAV and LNAV/VNAV, there is also a localizer performance without vertical guidance (LP) procedure for use when LPV vertical guidance is unavailable. Similar to LNAV, LP is flown to a minimum descent altitude (MDA) instead of DA.

== See also ==
- Index of aviation articles
