= Receiver autonomous integrity monitoring =

Algorithm to assess the integrity of GPS signals

Receiver autonomous integrity monitoring (RAIM) is a technology developed to assess the integrity of individual signals collected and integrated by the receiver units employed in a Global Navigation Satellite System (GNSS). In U.S. pilot guidance, the FAA describes RAIM as a GPS receiver capability for self-integrity monitoring to ensure available satellite signals meet integrity requirements for a given phase of flight. The integrity of received signals and resulting correctness and precision of derived receiver location are of special importance in safety-critical GNSS applications, such as in aviation or marine navigation.

The Global Positioning System (GPS) does not include any internal information about the integrity of its signals. It is possible for a GPS satellite to broadcast slightly incorrect information that will cause navigation information to be incorrect, but there is no way for the receiver to determine this using the standard techniques. RAIM uses redundant signals to produce several GPS position fixes and compare them, and a statistical function determines whether or not a fault can be associated with any of the signals. RAIM is considered available if 24 GPS satellites or more are operative. If the number of GPS satellites is 23 or fewer, RAIM availability must be checked using approved ground-based prediction software. The same mechanism applies to GNSS in general.

Several GPS-related systems also provide integrity signals separate from GPS. Among these is the WAAS system, which uses separate signals broadcast from different satellites to indicate these problems directly.

== Mechanism of operation ==
RAIM detects faults through redundant GPS pseudorange measurement. That is, when more satellites are available than needed to produce a position fix, the extra pseudoranges should all be consistent with the computed position. A pseudorange that differs significantly from the expected value (i.e., an outlier) may indicate a fault of the associated satellite or another signal integrity problem (e.g., ionospheric dispersion). Traditional RAIM uses fault detection (FD) only, however newer GPS receivers incorporate fault detection and exclusion (FDE) which enables them to continue to operate in the presence of a GPS failure.

The test statistic used is a function of the pseudorange measurement residual (the difference between the expected measurement and the observed measurement) and the amount of redundancy. The test statistic is compared with a threshold value, which is determined based on the required probability of false alarm (Pfa).

=== RAIM ===
Receiver autonomous integrity monitoring (RAIM) provides integrity monitoring of GPS for aviation and maritime applications. In order for a GPS receiver to perform RAIM or fault detection (FD) function, a minimum of five visible satellites with satisfactory geometry must be visible to it. RAIM has various kinds of implementations; one of them performs consistency checks between all position solutions obtained with various subsets of the visible satellites. The receiver provides an alert to the pilot if the consistency checks fail.

RAIM availability is an important issue when using such kind of algorithm in safety-critical applications (such as the aeronautical ones); in fact, because of geometry and satellite service maintenance, RAIM is not always available at all, meaning that the receiver's antenna could have sometimes fewer than five satellites in view.

Availability is also a performance indicator of the RAIM algorithm. Availability is a function of the geometry of the constellation which is in view and of other environmental conditions. If availability is seen in this way it is clear that it is not an on–off feature meaning that the algorithm could be available but not with the required performance of detecting a failure when it happens. So availability is a performance factor of the algorithm and characterizes each one of the different kinds of RAIM algorithms and methodologies.

=== Thresholds ===
The test statistic used is a function of the pseudorange measurement residual (the difference between the expected measurement and the observed measurement) and the amount of redundancy. The test statistic is compared with a threshold value, which is determined based on the requirements for the probability of false alarm (Pfa) and the expected measurement noise. In aviation systems, the Pfa is fixed at 1/15000.

The horizontal integrity limit (HIL) or horizontal protection level (HPL) is a figure which represents the radius of a circle which is centered on the GPS position solution and is guaranteed to contain the true position of the receiver to within the specifications of the RAIM scheme (i.e. which meets the Pfa and Pmd). The HPL is calculated as a function of the RAIM threshold and the satellite geometry at the time of the measurements. The HPL is compared with the horizontal alarm limit (HAL) to determine if RAIM is available.

In aviation, the GPS receivers can be "armed" to the approach mode for the destination airport, so that when the aircraft is within 30 nmi (56 km; 35 mi), the HAL threshold ("receiver sensitivity") will automatically change from en route (±5 nm) and RAIM (±2 nm) to terminal (±1 nm), and change again to ±0.3 nm at 2 nmi (3.7 km; 2.3 mi) before reaching the final approach way point.

=== Fault detection and exclusion ===
An enhanced version of RAIM employed in some receivers is known as fault detection and exclusion (FDE). At least one satellite, in addition to those required for navigation, must be in view for the receiver to perform the RAIM function; thus, RAIM needs a minimum of five satellites in view or four satellites and a barometric altimeter (baro-aiding, a method of augmenting the GPS integrity solution by using a non-satellite input source) to detect an integrity anomaly. For receivers capable of doing FDE, RAIM needs six satellites in view (or five satellites with baro-aiding) to isolate the corrupt satellite signal and remove it from the navigation solution.

Upon detection, proper fault exclusion determines and excludes the source of the failure (without necessarily identifying the individual source causing the problem), thereby allowing GNSS navigation to continue without interruption. RAIM is then performed on the remaining signals.

The availability of RAIM and FDE will be slightly lower for mid-latitude operations and slightly higher for equatorial and high-latitude regions due to the nature of the orbits. The use of satellites from multiple GNSS constellations or the use of SBAS satellites as additional ranging sources can improve the availability of RAIM and FDE.

== RAIM prediction ==
GNSS differs from traditional navigation systems because the satellites and areas of degraded coverage are in constant motion. Therefore, if a satellite fails or is taken out of service for maintenance, it is not immediately clear which areas of the airspace will be affected, if any. The location and duration of these outages can be predicted with the aid of computer analysis and reported to pilots during the pre-flight planning process. This prediction process is, however, not fully representative of all RAIM implementations in the different models of receivers. Prediction tools are usually conservative and thus predict lower availability than that actually encountered in flight to provide protection for the lowest end receiver models.

Because RAIM operates autonomously, that is without the assistance of external signals, it requires redundant pseudorange measurements. To obtain a 3D position solution, at least four measurements are required. To detect a fault, at least 5 measurements are required, and to isolate and exclude a fault, at least six measurements are required, however often more measurements are needed depending on the satellite geometry. Typically there are seven to 12 satellites in view.

=== RAIM prediction websites ===
To enable pilots to quickly determine whether en route or approach level RAIM will be available, the FAA and EUROCONTROL have created "dispatch level" websites that predict RAIM status to meet pre-flight check requirements.

- The FAA's RAIM prediction website "AC 90–100" covers US territories in graphical map format (showing green for RAIM available and red for RAIM not available)
- EUROCONTROL provides international coverage for most waypoints in the worldwide aviation waypoint database and displays results in a "timeline" bar showing predictions of whether baro-aided or non-baro-aided RAIM will be available.
  - EUROCONTROL puts a disclaimer on its data (stating that USCG data takes precedence), whereas the FAA certifies its website as meeting regulatory requirements.
  - As of 1 July 2012 AUGUR coverage has been limited to ECAC airspace only.
- Since 2006, the N-RAIM Prediction Service, hosted by NAVBLUE, offers worldwide coverage for all PBN applications including RNP 10, RNAV 5, RNAV 2, RNAV 1, RNP 4, RNP 1, RNP Approach and RNP AR Approach down to 0.1NM. The online tool is an alternative to the automated service integrated directly into flight planning software. It is kept up-to-date in line with new editions of the ICAO PBN Manual and any worldwide specific regulation.
- The SPACEKEYS RAIM prediction and avoidance system developed and hosted by FLIGHTKEYS offers worldwide coverage for any type of RAIM prediction and covers all integrity levels from RNP10 (Enroute) to RNP Approach and RNP AR Approach (down to 0.1NM). The online tool allows RAIM predictions for locations and full trajectories (routes) as well as area based RAIM predictions. REST and SOAP APIs are also available for 3rd party system integrations.
- bravoecho.ai is a modern API to calculate the outages for the planned route with customizable parameters, similar to AUGUR, but offering worldwide coverage, among other services. It features a LLM friendly integration documentation, too.

== Extensions ==
=== RAIM beyond one failure ===
Civilian aviation RAIM is generally designed to only detect and exclude one anomalous source (after possible FDE) using solution separation. However, generalized RAIM systems that detect and exclude multiple anomalies have been designed.

=== ARIM ===
RAIM is considered to be a class of Aircraft-Based Augmentation System (ABAS), a kind of GNSS augmentation that enhances integrity by changing the decision-making process on the aircraft. ABAS includes RAIM and Airborne Autonomous Integrity Monitoring (AAIM), the latter combining onboard sensors and other measurements with GNSS. Other GNSS augmentation techniques such as SBAS and GBAS are commonly used to provide both integrity and precision.

=== Advanced RAIM ===
Advanced RAIM (ARAIM) describes a 2010 plan for ensuring LPV-200 performance worldwide by 2030. This would require the application of RAIM to vertical guidance in addition to the current use for lateral guidance (LNAV), with analogous protection levels and alarm limits for the vertical component. It is recommended that ARAIM incorporates dual-frequency (L1/L5) receivers, multiple constellations, and the use of an Integrity Support Message (ISM) received from the approving regulatory agency providing information on the reliability of constellations. A joint constellation of 24 Galileo satellites and 21 GPS satellites is known to be sufficient for ARAIM.

ARAIM uses a solution separation algorithm. It remains based on the use of pseudorange residuals, in this case scaled to the position domain. Multiple faults should be considered in the vertical case.

The horizontal-only version of ARAIM (H-ARAIM) requires no ISM as it can simply use performance commitments from GNSS constellations (its loss is of "Major" severity). V-ARAIM requries ISM because its loss would be of "Hazardous" severity: some other information source needs to indicate whether tighter bounds are followed. The precise content and update interval of ISM remains under study as of 2022.

=== Other algorithms ===
The ESA's Navipedia describes RAIM algorithms in detail. In addition to the Measurement Rejection Approach (MRA) algorithms used in aviation, there is also an Error Characterization Approach (ECA) which provides higher availability on land and lower computational cost at the cost of inflated PL estimates.

== Standards ==
- FAA Technical Standard Order (TSO)-C129a, Airborne Supplemental Navigation Equipment Using the Global Positioning System (GPS)
- RTCA DO-208 - Minimum Operational Performance Standards for Airborne Supplemental Navigation Equipment Using Global Positioning System (GPS)
