= ELoran =

Long-range radio navigation system

Enhanced LORAN (commonly known as eLoran; also known as eLORAN, E-LORAN, or e-LORAN) is a long-range radio navigation system that uses terrestrial towers and the hyperbolic navigation technique. It is an advancement in receiver design and transmission characteristics which increase the accuracy and usefulness of traditional LORAN and LORAN-C.

Interest has been renewed by the potential vulnerability of global navigation satellite systems, and their own propagation and reception limitations. With reported accuracy as good as ± 8 meters, the system becomes competitive with unenhanced GPS. eLoran also includes additional pulses which can transmit auxiliary data such as Differential GPS (DGPS) corrections, as well as ensure data integrity against spoofing.

eLoran receivers use "all in view" reception, incorporating signals from all stations in range, not solely those from a single Group Repetition Interval (GRI), incorporating time signals and other data from up to forty stations. These enhancements in LORAN make it adequate as a substitute for scenarios where GPS is unavailable or degraded.

In 2017 it was reported by the United States Maritime Association that the United States Coast Guard had reported several episodes of GPS interference in the Black Sea. South Korea has claimed that North Korea has jammed GPS near the border, interfering with airplanes and ships.

== eLoran systems by country ==
=== United Kingdom ===
In 2007, the UK Department for Transport (DfT), awarded a 15-year contract to provide an Enhanced LORAN service to improve the safety of mariners in the UK and Western Europe. The service contract was to operate in two phases, with development work and further focus for European agreement on eLoran service provision from 2007 through 2010, and full operation of the eLoran service from 2010 through 2022. The first eLoran transmitter was situated at Anthorn Radio Station Cumbria. The system was expected to feature seven eLoran transmitters in the UK, however in light of the decision by France and Norway to cease Loran transmissions on 31 December 2015, the UK announced at the start of that month that its eLoran service would be discontinued on the same day, with just the Anthorn transmitter remaining for research purposes.

As of 2021, the UK still maintained one eLoran station capable of providing timing information, although a single station is unable to provide positioning data.

In 2025 the UK government announced £155 million investment in Positioning, Navigation, and Timing (PNT) infrastructure including £71 million for a UK national eLoran programme.

=== United States ===
By 2018, the United States planned to build a new eLoran system as a complement to and backup for the GPS system. As of November 2021, no eLoran system has deployed.

=== South Korea ===
In 2013 South Korea announced plans to work towards replacing its Loran-C system with an expanded eLoran system.

The South Korean government has pushed plans to have three eLoran beacons active by 2019, which would be enough to provide accurate corrections for all shipments in the region if North Korea (or anyone else) tries to block GPS again.

=== People's Republic of China ===
In 2024 it was reported China had completed a nationwide eLoran network.

=== France ===
In 2025 France announced plans to begin collaborating with the UK on resilient PNT.

== See also ==
- Gee – Radio navigation system
- Hyperbolic navigation – Class of radio navigation systems
- CHAYKA – Radio navigation system
