= System for Differential Corrections and Monitoring =

Russian satellite navigation augmentation system

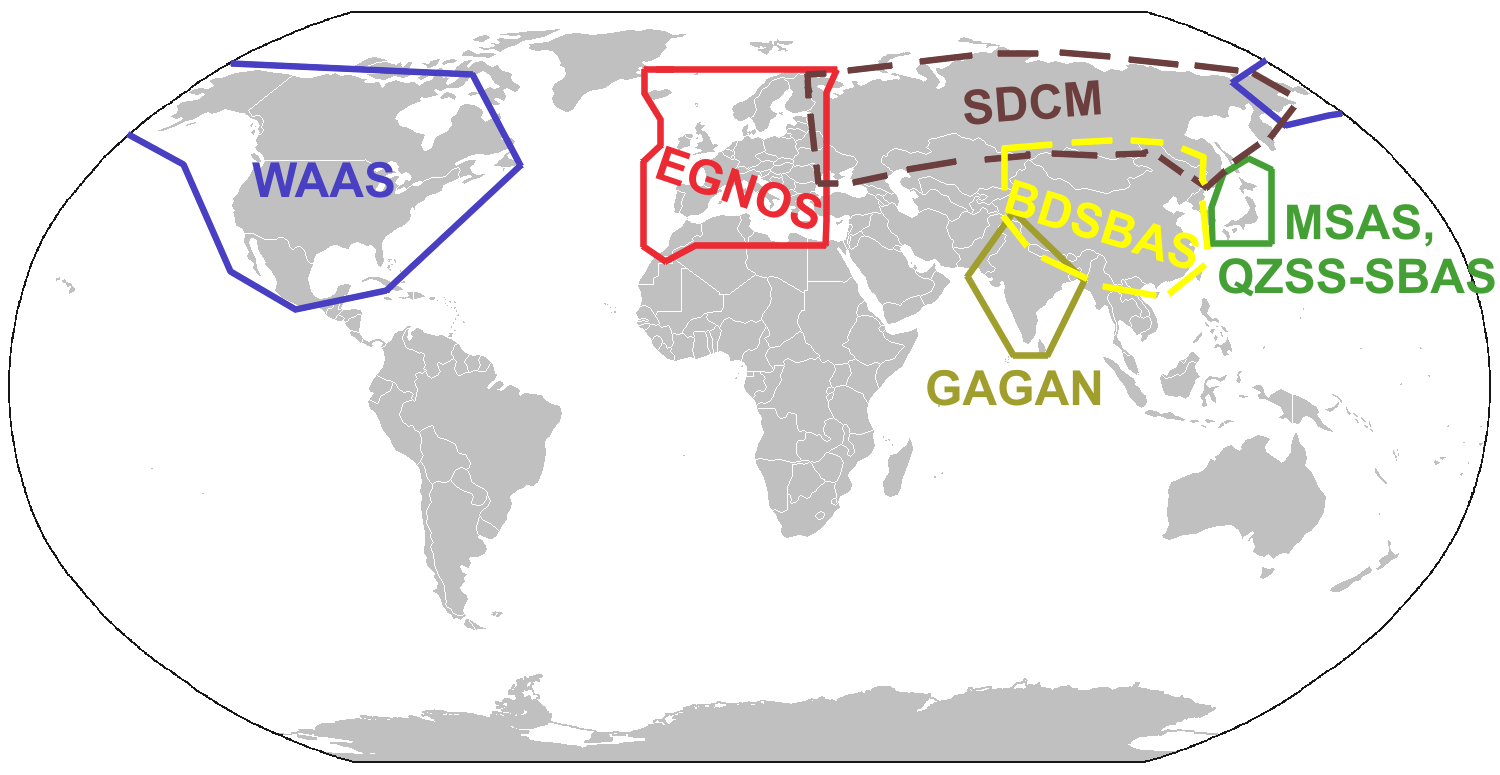
SDCM service area

The System for Differential Corrections and Monitoring (SDCM), is the satellite-based navigation augmentation system operated by Russia's Roscosmos space agency to augment the precision of the GLONASS satellite navigation system. It uses the Luch Multifunctional Space Relay System to transmit correction data.

SDCM's service area covers the Russian Federation. As of 2021 it had not yet been certified for use for public aviation.
