= Joint Direct Attack Munition =

American GPS bomb guidance kit

Joint Direct Attack Munitions (JDAM)
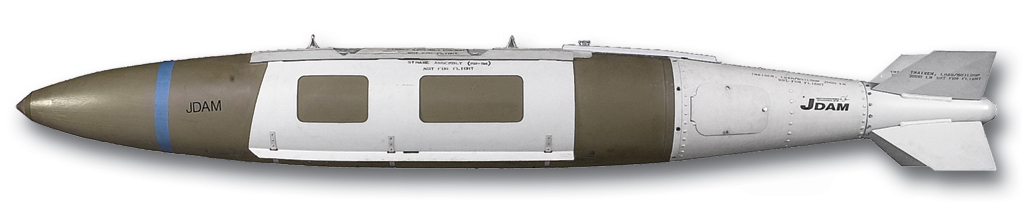
- A Mk 84 bomb fitted with GBU-31 JDAM kit
- Place of origin: United States

Service history
- In service: Since 1999
- Used by: See operators
- Wars: NATO bombing of Yugoslavia; Kurdish–Turkish conflict; War on terror; War in Afghanistan; Iraq War; War in North-West Pakistan; Al-Qaeda insurgency in Yemen; Somalia War (2006–2009); Somali Civil War; First Libyan Civil War; Syrian Civil War; American-led intervention in the Syrian Civil War; American-led intervention in Iraq; Turkish military intervention in Syria; Operation Olive Branch; War in Iraq (2013–2017); Yemeni Civil War; Saudi Arabian-led intervention in Yemen; Houthi–Saudi Arabian conflict; Siege of Marawi; Russian invasion of Ukraine; Gaza war; Israel–Hezbollah conflict (2023–present); 2024 Israeli invasion of Lebanon; Operation Prosperity Guardian; Operation Poseidon Archer; Twelve-Day War; 2026 Iran war

Production history
- Designer: McDonnell Douglas
- Designed: Late 1980s–1996
- Manufacturer: Boeing Defense, Space & Security
- Unit cost: US $21,000–$36,000 (Note: In the 2021 fiscal year the USAF paid an average US $21,000 per JDAM kit and the USN an average US $22,208 per JDAM kit for orders within their respective base budgets, laser JDAM kits were included in these averages. In the same year, orders for kits through the supplemental Overseas Contingency Operations budget were an average unit cost of $36,000 for the USAF and $23,074 for the USN.)
- Variants: See variants

Specifications (see specifications)
- Launch platform: F-15E, F-16, F/A-18, F/A-18E/F, AV-8B, A-10, B-1B, B-52H, F-22, B-2A, F-35, MQ-9, MiG-29, Su-27, Tornado, Gripen
- References: Janes & The War Zone

The Joint Direct Attack Munition (JDAM) is a guidance kit that converts unguided bombs, or "dumb bombs", into all-weather precision-guided munitions (PGMs). JDAM-equipped bombs are guided by an integrated inertial guidance system coupled to a Global Positioning System (GPS) receiver, giving them a published range of up to 15 nautical miles (28 km). JDAM-equipped bombs range from 500 to 2,000 pounds (230 to 910 kg). The JDAM's guidance system was jointly developed by the United States Air Force and United States Navy, hence the "joint" in JDAM. When installed on a bomb, the JDAM kit is given a GBU (Guided Bomb Unit) identifier, superseding the Mark 80 or BLU (Bomb, Live Unit) nomenclature of the bomb to which it is attached.

The JDAM is not a stand-alone weapon; rather it is a "bolt-on" guidance package that converts unguided gravity bombs into PGMs. The key components of the system are a tail section with aerodynamic control surfaces, a (body) strake kit, and a combined inertial guidance system and GPS guidance control unit.

The JDAM was meant to improve upon laser-guided bomb and imaging infrared technology, which can be hindered by bad ground and weather conditions. Laser seekers are now being fitted to some JDAMs.

From 1998 to November 2016, Boeing completed more than 300,000 JDAM guidance kits. In 2017, it built more than 130 kits per day. As of January 2024, 550,000 kits had been produced.

== History ==
=== Development ===
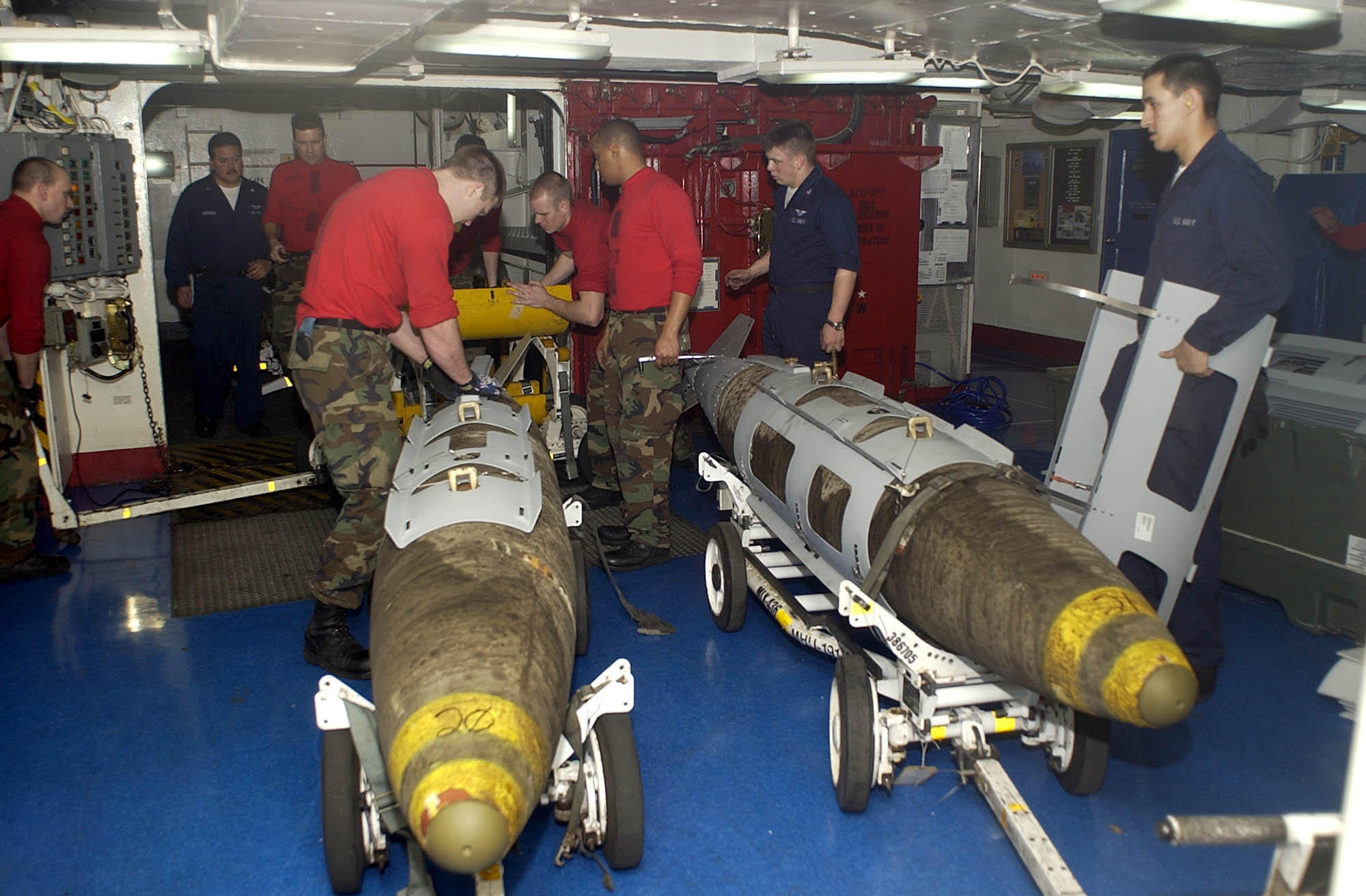
U.S. Navy sailors attach a JDAM kit aboard the USS Constellation (CV-64), March 2003.

The U.S. Air Force's bombing campaign during the Persian Gulf War was less effective than initially reported, in part because it had no precision bombs that were accurate in all types of weather. Laser guidance packages on bombs proved exceptionally accurate in clear conditions, but amid airborne dust, smoke, fog, or cloud cover, they had difficulty maintaining "lock" on the laser designation; they also could not be released at high altitudes. Research, development, testing and evaluation (RDT&E) of an "adverse weather precision guided munition" began in 1992. Several proposals were considered, including a radical concept that used GPS.

At the time, there were few GPS satellites and the idea of using satellite navigation for real-time weapon guidance was untested and controversial. To identify the technical risk associated with an INS/GPS guided weapon, the Air Force created in early 1992 a rapid-response High Gear program called the "JDAM Operational Concept Demonstration" (OCD) at Eglin Air Force Base. Honeywell, Interstate Electronics Corporation, Sverdrup Technology, and General Dynamics were hired to help the USAF 46th Test Wing demonstrate the feasibility of a GPS weapon within one year. The OCD program fitted a GBU-15 guided bomb with an INS/GPS guidance kit and on 10 February 1993, dropped the first INS/GPS weapon from an F-16 on a target 88,000 feet (27 km) downrange. Five more tests were run in various weather conditions, altitudes, and ranges. The OCD program demonstrated a 36-foot (11 m) Circular Error Probable (CEP).

Eager to arm the B-2 Spirit stealth bomber, which lacked a laser designator, with an interim precision guided conventional munition before the JDAM could be fielded, Northrop Grumman launched a program called "GPS Aided Munition", or GAM, which paired inertial navigation with GPS to correct for drift and allowed for exceptional accuracy while still retaining combat functionality in GPS-denied environments. The GAM munitions consisted primarily of 2,000 lb Mk 84 bombs with a tail guidance kit added, which were designated GBU-36/B GAM; these munitions are considered the direct predecessors of the JDAM. The GAM munitions were combined with a GPS Aided Targeting System (GATS) on the B-2, which could interface with the AN/APQ-181 synthetic aperture radar to enable extreme accuracy with a 20-foot CEP, approximately half of what a JDAM without GATS/radar support could achieve. GAMs were always intended as an interim solution until the JDAM could replace them; with McDonnell Douglas (later Boeing) already having been selected for the JDAM program in October 1995.

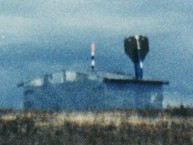
The first flight test of the first GPS-guided weapon resulted in a direct hit on a target at Eglin Air Force Base on 10 February 1993.

The first JDAM kits were delivered in 1997, with operational testing conducted in 1998 and 1999. During testing, over 450 JDAMs were dropped achieving a system reliability in excess of 95% with a published accuracy under 33-foot (10 m) CEP. In addition to controlled parameter drops, the testing and evaluation of the JDAM also included "operationally representative tests" consisting of drops through clouds, rain and snow with no decrease in accuracy from clear-weather tests. In addition, there have been tests involving multiple weapon drops with each weapon being individually targeted.

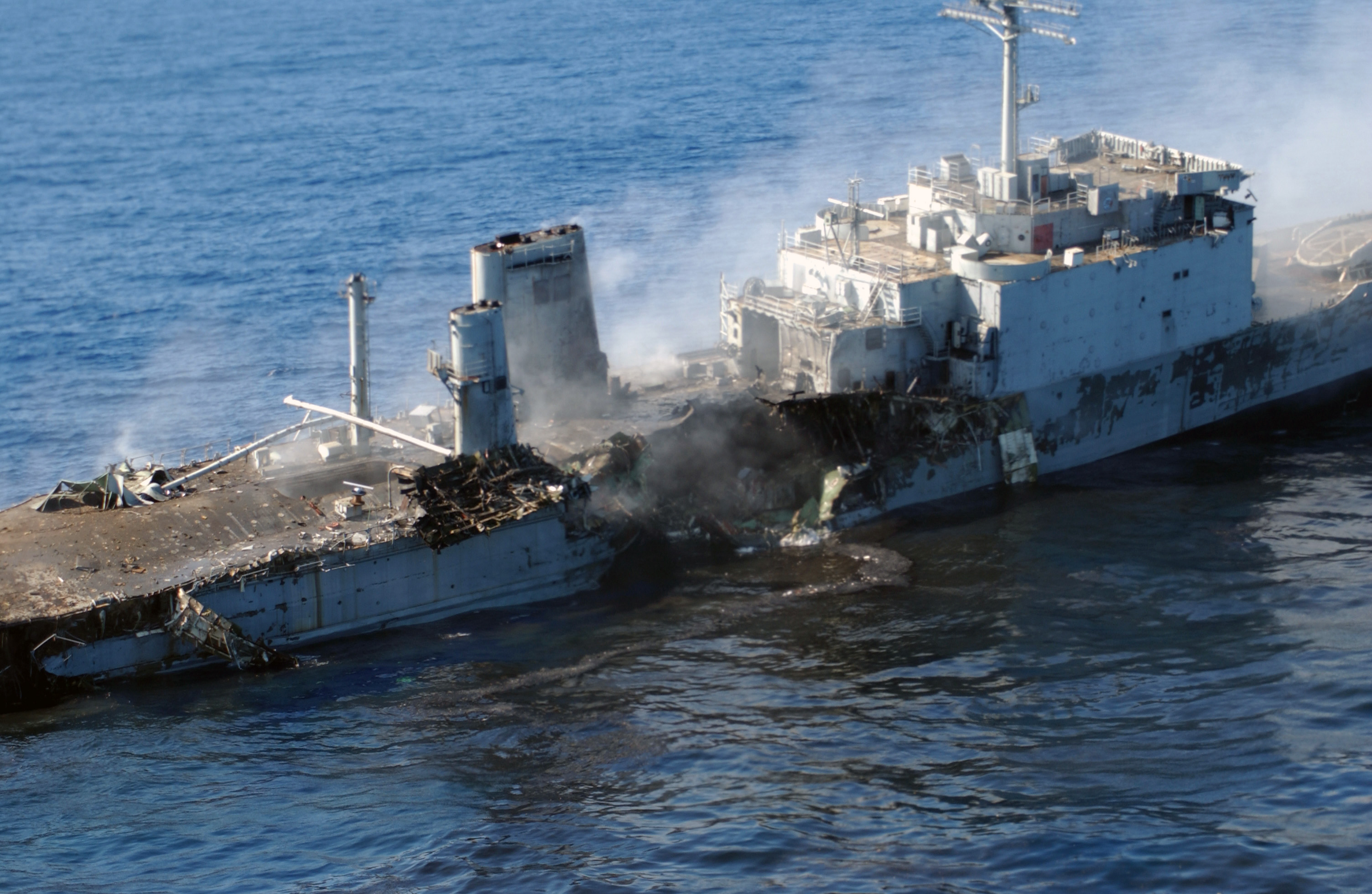
Ex-Schenectady (LST-1185) damaged by seven 2,000-pound JDAMs during USAF exercise Resultant Fury in November 2004.

JDAM and the B-2 Spirit stealth bomber made their combat debuts during Operation Allied Force. The B-2s, flying 30-hour, nonstop, round-trip flights from Whiteman Air Force Base, Missouri, delivered more than 650 JDAMs during Allied Force. As this utilized most of the US GBU-31 inventory, which only numbered 600 at the start of the conflict (all of which were reserved for the B-2 Spirit), this was supplemented by an additional 224 GAMs. An article published in the Acquisition Review Journal in 2002 cites that "during Operation Allied Force ... B-2s launched 651 JDAMs with 96% reliability and hit 87% of intended targets..." Due to the operational success of the original JDAM, the program expanded to the 500-pound (230 kg) Mark 82 and 1,000-pound (450 kg) Mark 83, beginning development in late 1999. As a result of lessons from Operation Enduring Freedom and Operation Iraqi Freedom, both the US Navy and US Air Force pursued improvements to the kits such as better GPS accuracy as well as a laser seeker for terminal guidance for use against moving targets.

JDAM bombs are inexpensive compared to alternatives such as cruise missiles. The original cost estimate was $40,000 each for the tail kits; however, after competitive bidding, contracts were signed with McDonnell Douglas (later Boeing) for delivery at $18,000 each. Unit costs, in current-year dollars, have since increased to $21,000 in 2004 and $27,000 by 2011. To the cost of the tail kit should be added the costs of the Mk80-series iron bomb, the fuse and proximity sensor which bring the overall weapon cost to about $30,000 (FY2012). For comparison, the newest Tomahawk cruise missile, dubbed the Tactical Tomahawk, costs nearly $1.87 million (FY2017).

=== Operational use ===
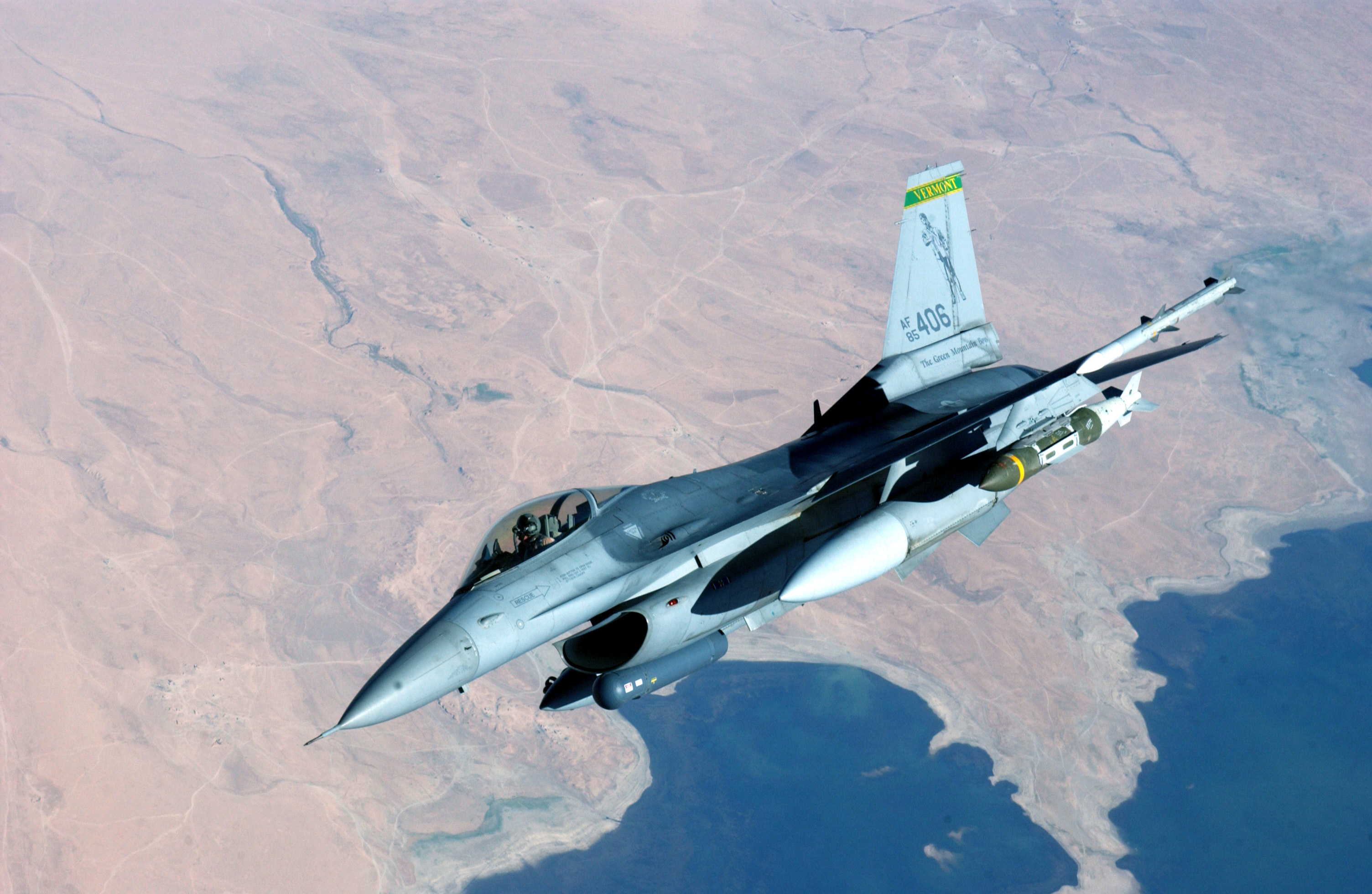
JDAMs loaded under the left wing of an F-16 Fighting Falcon, with a LITENING II Targeting Pod visible beneath the fuselage

Guidance is facilitated through a tail control system and a GPS-aided inertial navigation system (INS). The navigation system is initialized by transfer alignment from the aircraft that provides position and velocity vectors from the aircraft systems. Once released from the aircraft, the JDAM autonomously navigates to the designated target coordinates. Target coordinates can be loaded into the aircraft before takeoff, manually altered by the aircrew in flight prior to weapon release, or entered by a datalink from onboard targeting equipment, such as the LITENING II or "Sniper" targeting pods. In its most accurate mode, the JDAM system will provide a minimum weapon accuracy CEP of 16 feet (5 m) or less when a GPS signal is available. If the GPS signal is jammed or lost, the JDAM can still achieve a 98-foot (30 m) CEP or less for free flight times up to 100 seconds.

The introduction of GPS guidance to weapons brought several improvements to air-to-ground warfare. The first is a real all-weather capability since GPS is not affected by rain, clouds, fog, smoke, or artificial obscurants. Previous precision guided weapons relied on seekers using infrared, visual light, or a reflected laser spot to "see" the ground target. These seekers were not effective when the target was obscured by fog and low altitude clouds and rain (as encountered in Kosovo), or by dust and smoke (as encountered in Desert Storm).

The second advantage is an expanded launch acceptance region (LAR). The LAR defines the region that the aircraft must be within to launch the weapon and hit the target. Non-GPS based precision guided weapons using seekers to guide to the target have significant restrictions on the launch envelope due to the seeker field of view. Some of these systems (such as the Paveway I, II, and III) must be launched so that the target remains in the seeker field of view throughout the weapon trajectory (or for lock-on-after-launch engagements, the weapon must be launched so that the target is in the field of view during the terminal flight). This requires the aircraft to fly generally straight at the target when launching the weapon.

This restriction is eased in some other systems, such as the GBU-15 and the AGM-130, through the ability of a Weapon System Operator (WSO) in the aircraft to manually steer the weapon to the target. Using a WSO requires a data link between the weapon and the controlling aircraft and requires the controlling aircraft to remain in the area (and possibly vulnerable to defensive fire) as long as the weapon is under manual control. Since GPS-based flight control systems know the weapon's current location and the target location, these weapons can autonomously adjust the trajectory to hit the target. This allows the launch aircraft to release the weapon at very large off-axis angles including releasing weapons to attack targets behind the aircraft.

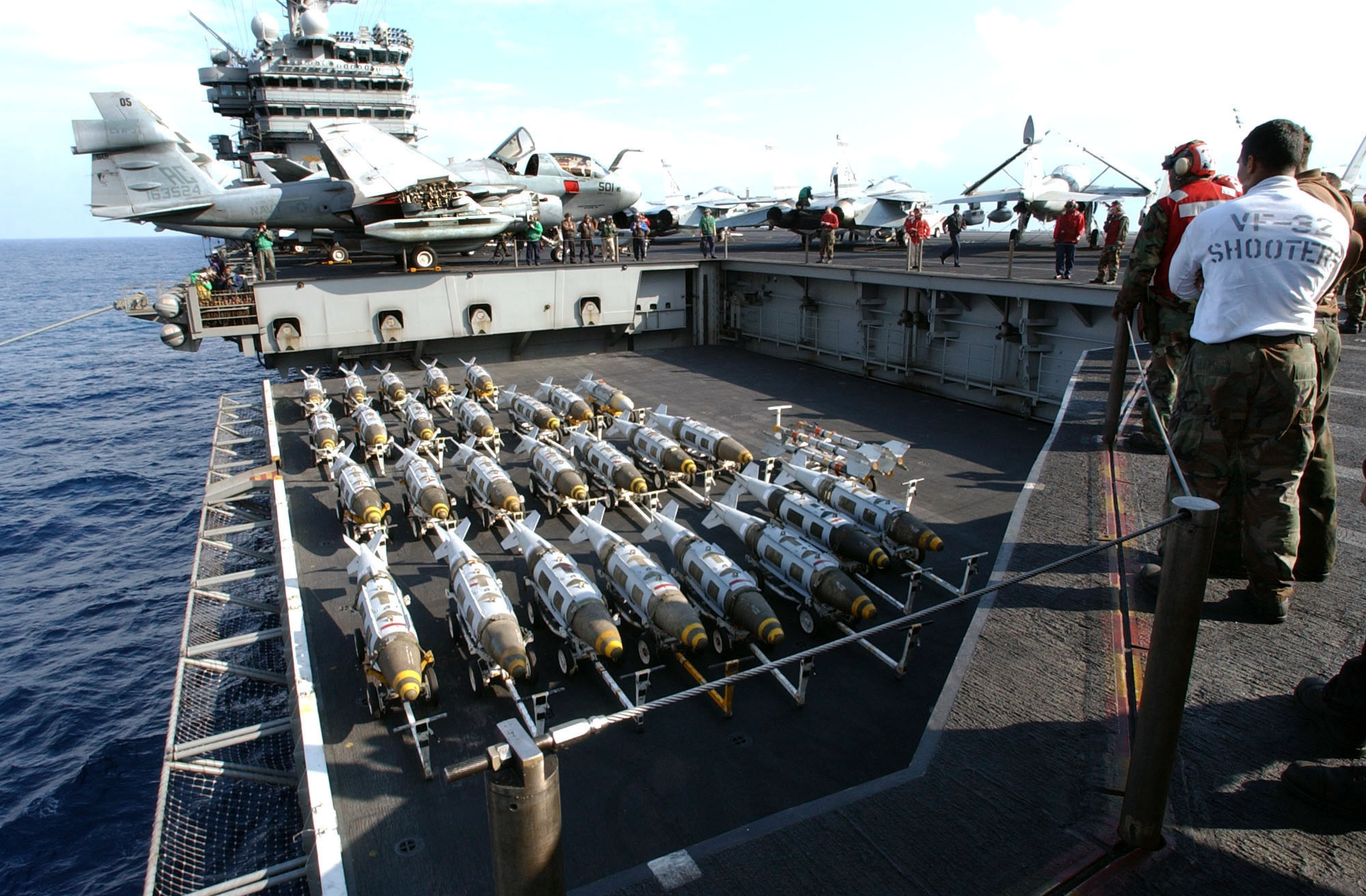
JDAMs prior to being loaded for operations over Iraq, 2003

The third advantage is a true "fire-and-forget" capability in which the weapon does not require any support after being launched. This allows the launching aircraft to leave the target area and proceed to its next mission immediately after launching the GPS guided weapon.

Another important capability provided by GPS-based guidance is the ability to completely tailor a flight trajectory to meet criteria other than simply hitting a target. Weapon trajectories can be controlled so that a target can be impacted at precise headings and vertical angles. This provides the ability to impact perpendicular to a target surface and minimize the angle of attack (maximizing penetration), detonate the warhead at the optimum angle to maximize the warhead effectiveness, or have the weapon fly into the target area from a different heading than the launch aircraft (decreasing the risk of detection of the aircraft). GPS also provides an accurate time source common to all systems; this allows multiple weapons to loiter and impact targets at preplanned times and intervals.

In recognition of these advantages, most weapons including the Paveway, GBU-15, and the AGM-130 have been upgraded with a GPS capability. This enhancement combines the flexibility of GPS with the superior accuracy of seeker guidance.

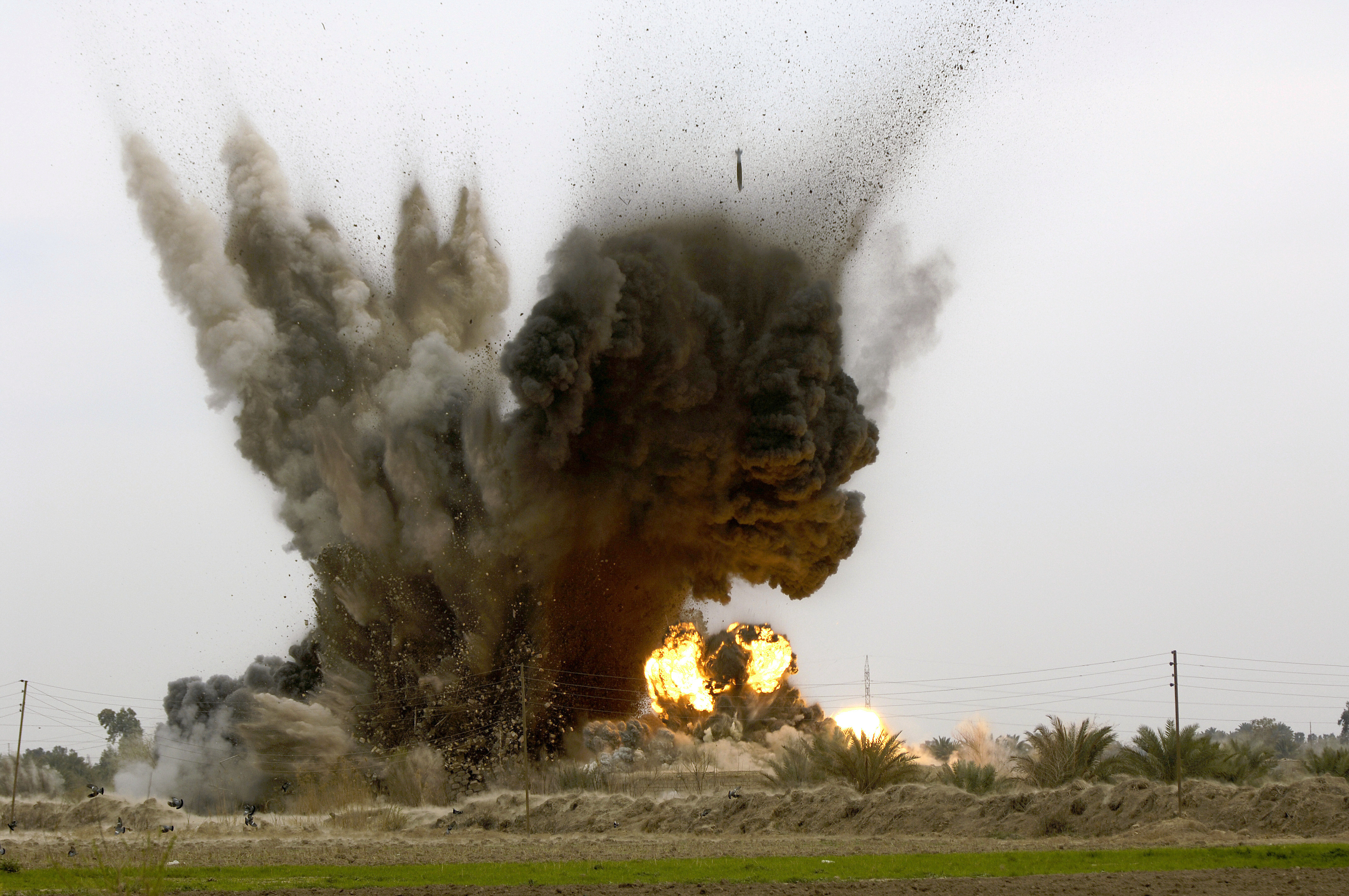
GBU-38 explosions in Iraq in 2008.

Despite their precision, JDAM employment has risks. On 5 December 2001, a JDAM dropped by a B-52 in Afghanistan nearly killed Hamid Karzai while he was leading anti-Taliban forces near Sayd Alim Kalay alongside a US Army Special Forces (SF) team. A large force of Taliban soldiers had engaged the combined force of Karzai's men and their American SF counterparts, nearly overwhelming them. The SF commander requested Close Air Support (CAS) to strike the Taliban positions in an effort to stop their advance. A JDAM was subsequently dropped, but instead of striking the Taliban positions, it struck the Afghan/American position, killing three and injuring 20. An investigation of the incident determined that the U.S. Air Force Tactical Control Party (TACP) attached to the Special Forces team had changed the battery in the GPS receiver at some point during the battle, thereby causing the device to return to "default" and "display its own coordinates." Not realizing that this had occurred, the TACP relayed his own coordinates to the delivery aircraft.

On 5 May 2023, during the 2022 Russian invasion of Ukraine, MSN reported that Russia was able to jam the GPS guidance system to cause JDAMs to miss their targets. The leaked Pentagon document described the JDAMs as being particularly susceptible to the disruption.

On 6 June 2023, the Royal United Services Institute (RUSI) released a commentary by an electronic warfare (EW) expert on the jamming of JDAMs by Russian forces. The paper notes that the Russian R-330Zh Zhitel has had impacted GPS signals that JDAMs rely on. GPS signals are "very weak by the time they have travelled the 10,900 nautical miles (20,200 km) from the satellite to Earth", making them "easy to jam with comparatively little power". In the "early 2000s" the US military rolled out the Selective availability anti-spoofing module (SAASM), along with encrypted military M-code GPS signaling to ensure that the JDAM only accepts signals with correct encryption and rejects all other signals. However, according to one electronic warfare expert who spoke to RUSI, despite the mentioned steps to increase jamming resiliency, the "sheer brute force" of a powerful jamming signal can prevent the JDAM's global navigation satellite system (GNSS) receiver from obtaining the encrypted signal. EW units might also have the ability to spoof or fake the M-Code that it confuses the JDAM as to its location and time. Counter-EW systems, while classified, might allow a JDAM to recognize a jamming signal and its direction and "block out" signals coming from that direction.

On 13 August 2024, Ukrainian Su-27 launched a JDAM at a Russian command post in Tetkino, which was reportedly destroyed.

In December 2023, the WSJ report stated that US arms shipments to Israel since the start of the Gaza war included approximately 3,000 JDAMs. Israeli F-15I fighter jets are believed to have used BLU-109 bunker buster bombs with JDAM guidance kits in the strikes that killed Hezbollah leader Hassan Nasrallah in Beirut, Lebanon on 27 September 2024.

JDAMs were used in combat by the US and Israel in the 2026 Iran war.

=== Upgrades ===
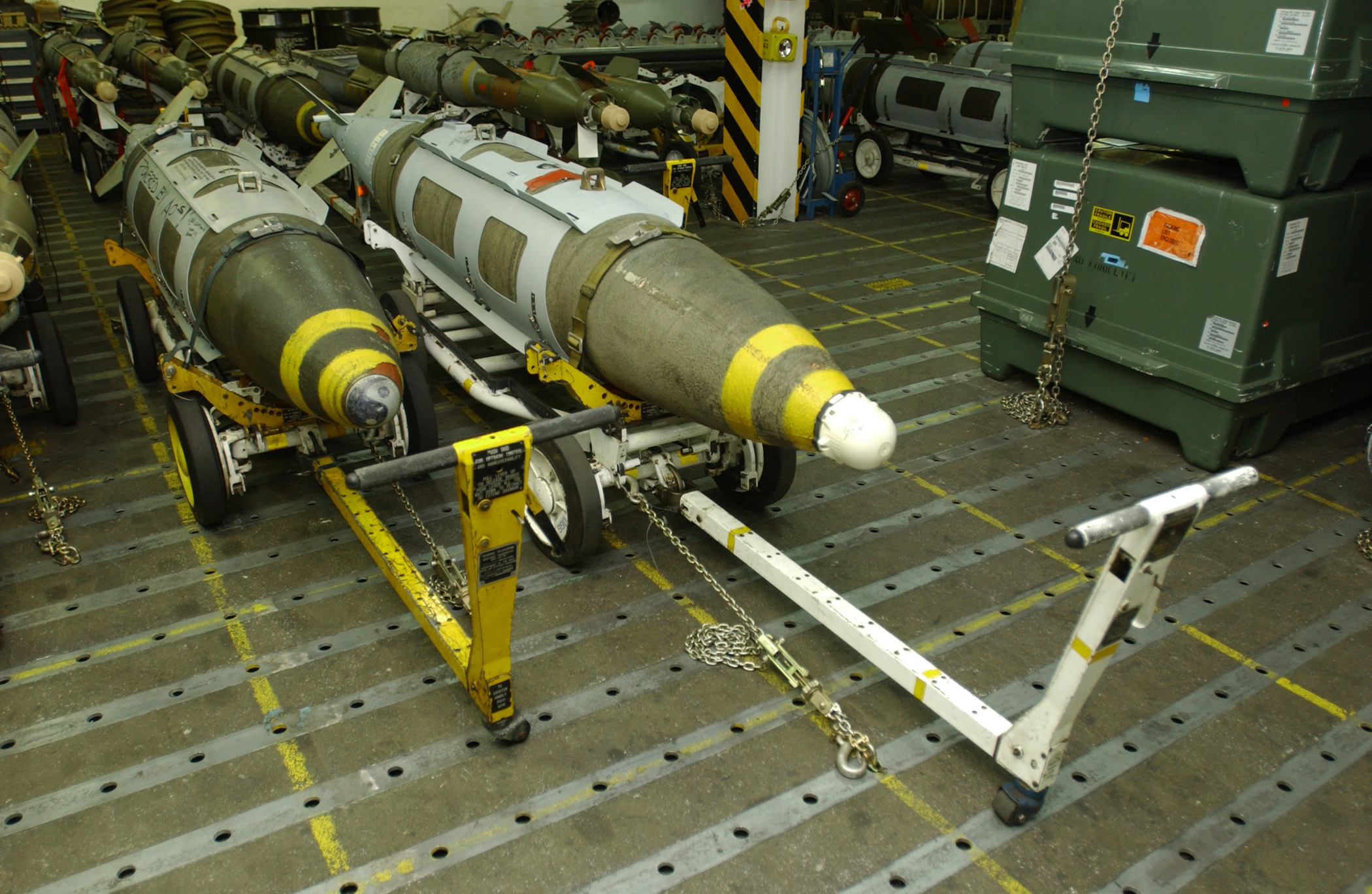
A DSU-33 Airburst sensor (right)

Experience during Operation Enduring Freedom and Operation Iraqi Freedom led US air power planners to seek additional capabilities in one package, resulting in ongoing program upgrades to place a precision terminal guidance seeker in the JDAM kit. The Laser JDAM (LJDAM), as this upgrade is known, adds a laser seeker to the nose of a JDAM-equipped bomb, enabling it to engage moving targets. The laser seeker is a cooperative development between Boeing's Defense, Space and Security unit and Israel's Elbit Systems.

It is called the Precision Laser Guidance Set (PLGS) by Boeing and consists of the laser seeker itself, now known as DSU-38/B, and a wire harness fixed under the bomb body to connect the DSU-38/B with the tail kit. During FY2004, Boeing and the U.S. Air Force began testing of the laser guidance capability for JDAM, with these tests demonstrating that the system is capable of targeting and destroying moving targets. This dual guidance system retains the ability to operate on GPS/INS alone, if laser guidance is unavailable, with the same accuracy of the earlier JDAM.

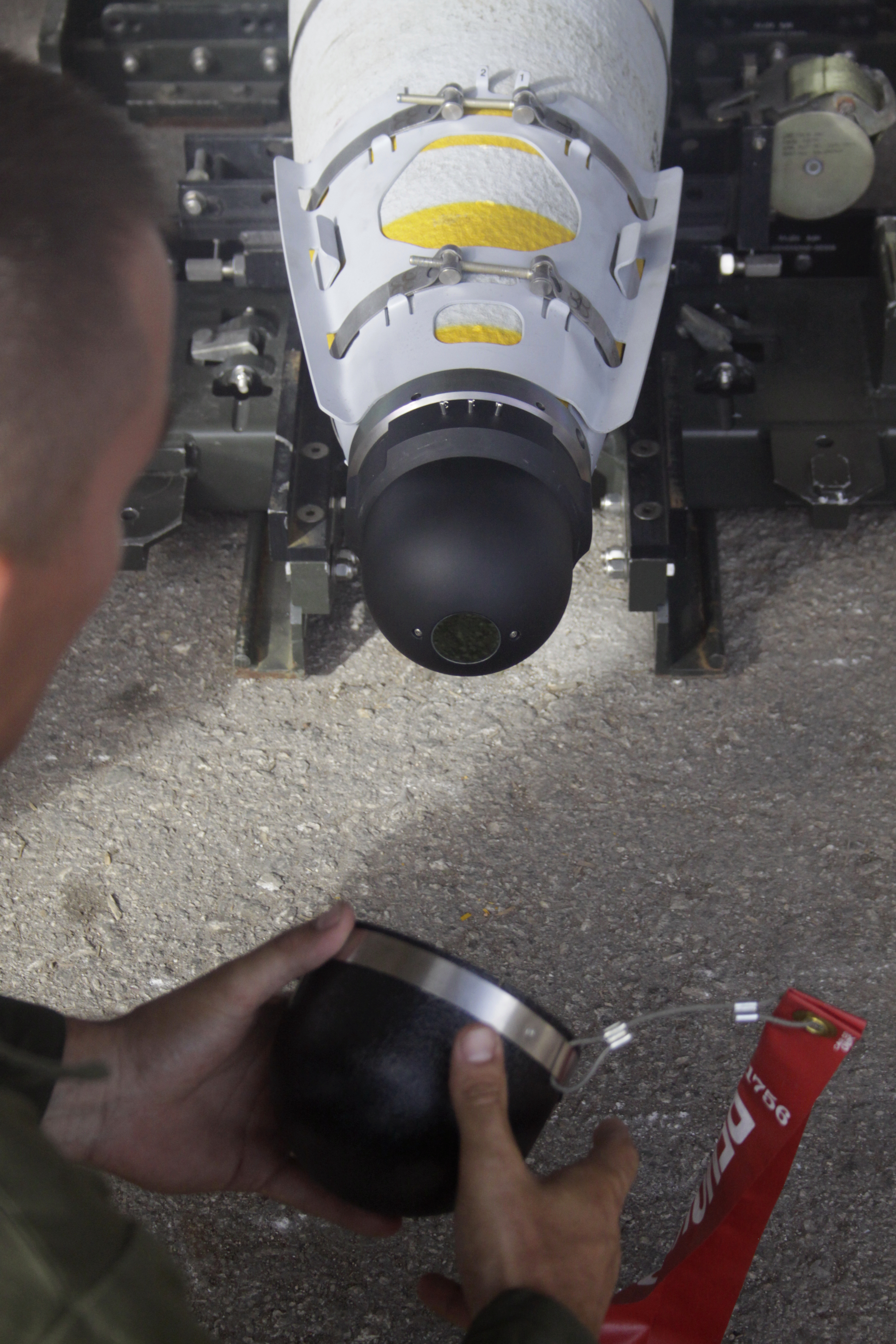
A GBU-54 laser seeker

In June 2007, Boeing announced that it had been awarded a $28 million contract by the U.S. Air Force to deliver 600 laser seekers (400 to the Air Force and 200 to the Navy) by June 2009. According to the Boeing Corporation, in tests at Nellis Air Force Base, Nevada, Air Force F-16 Fighting Falcons and F-15E Strike Eagles dropped twelve 500 lb (230 kg) LJDAMs that successfully struck high-speed moving targets. Using onboard targeting equipment, the launch aircraft self-designated, and self-guided their bombs to impact on the targets. In addition to the LJDAM kits, Boeing is also testing under a Navy development contract, an anti-jamming system for the JDAM, with development expected to be completed during 2007, with deliveries to commence in 2008. The system is known as the Integrated GPS Anti-Jam System (IGAS).

In July 2008 Germany signed a contract with Boeing to become the first international customer of LJDAM. Deliveries for the German Air Force began in mid-2009. The order also includes the option for further kits in 2009.

Boeing announced in September 2008 that it had conducted demonstration flights with the LJDAM loaded aboard a B-52H.

The GBU-54 LJDAM made its combat debut in August 2008 in Iraq when an F-16 from the 77th Fighter Squadron engaged a moving vehicle in Diyala province. The GBU-54 LJDAM made its combat debut in the Afghan theater by the 510th Fighter Squadron in October 2010.

In September 2012, Boeing began full-rate production of Laser JDAM for US Navy and received a contract for more than 2,300 bomb kits.

In November 2014, the U.S. Air Force began development of a version of the GBU-31 JDAM intended to track and attack sources of electronic warfare jamming directed to disrupt the munitions' guidance. The Home-on-Jam seeker works similar to the AGM-88 HARM to follow the source of a radio-frequency jammer to destroy it.

=== JDAM Extended Range ===
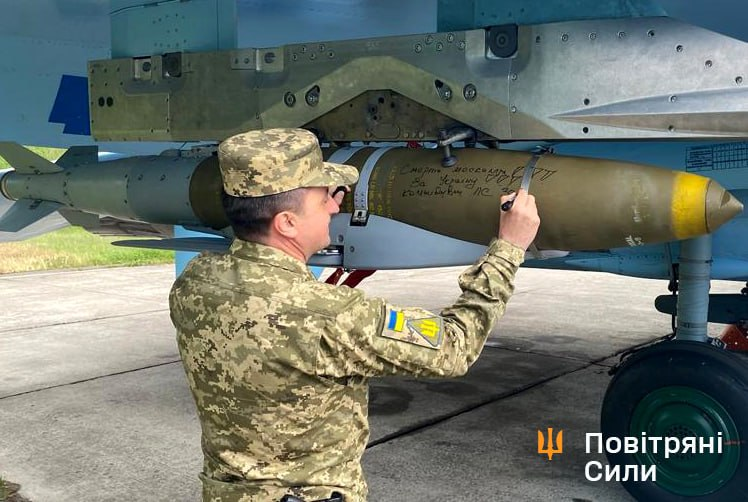
JDAM-ER attached to a modified pylon under the wing of a Ukrainian Air Force Su-27

In 2006, the Australian Defence Science and Technology Organisation in conjunction with Boeing Australia successfully tested extended range 500 lb (230 kg) JDAM variants at the Woomera Test Range.

In 2009, Boeing announced that it will jointly develop the Joint Direct Attack Munition Extended Range (JDAM-ER) 2,000 lb (910 kg) version with South Korea. The wing kit will triple the range of JDAM to 80 kilometres (50 mi) for the same accuracy, and will cost $10,000 per unit. The first prototypes were completed in 2010 or 2011.

The wing kits of Australia's JDAM-ER weapons will be built by Ferra Engineering. First tests were to be conducted in 2013 with production orders in 2015.

In late February 2023, it was revealed that JDAM-ERs would be provided to the Ukrainian Air Force as part of an arms package during the Russian invasion of Ukraine. With a standoff range of up to 72 km (45 mi), it delivers similar range to M142 HIMARS rockets, but with heavier warheads and at a lower cost. Although Russian air defenses force Ukrainian aircraft to fly at extremely low levels, they could pop up and release the bombs on a lofted trajectory to glide toward a target. Ukrainian platforms needed modifications to employ the weapons, as had been done with the AGM-88 HARM. The JDAM-ER was already in use by the Ukrainians by the time of the reports of its delivery.

Yuriy Ignat, a spokesman for Air Force Command of the Ukrainian Armed Force, told Ukrainian TV that: "These bombs (JDAM) are slightly less powerful, but extremely accurate. I would like to have more such bombs for success at the front." This comment might be a reference to the fact that these bombs are 225 kg (500 lbs). As to how many were supplied one US official said "enough to do a couple of strikes."

On 26 April, the first recorded use of JDAMs, by the Ukrainian Air Force, occurred in Bakhmut. Four 225 kg (500 pounds) JDAMs were dropped on a high rise building in the Russian controlled part of the city, the aircraft used appear to be MiG-29s. Both sides have destroyed high rise buildings in Bakhmut to prevent them from being used "as ammo dumps, fighting positions and observation posts."

In response to Russian use of electronic warfare to jam GPS-guided weapons, in May 2024 the U.S. awarded a contract for the acquisition of Home-on GPS Jam seekers to be integrated into JDAM wing kits for Ukraine.

On 3 February 2025, the Ukrainian Air Force released footage of a Su-27 dropping two 1,000 lb (450 kg) Mark 83 bombs. Previously the existence of a 1,000 lb variant of the JDAM-ER wasn't known to exist, indicating it was made specifically for Ukrainian usage.

There are three known versions of the JDAM-ER defined by weight class, the 500 lb (230 kg) GBU-62 using the Mark 82, the 1,000 lb (450 kg) GBU-63 using the Mark 83 and the 2,000 lb (910 kg) GBU-64 using the Mark 84.

=== JDAM Long Range ===
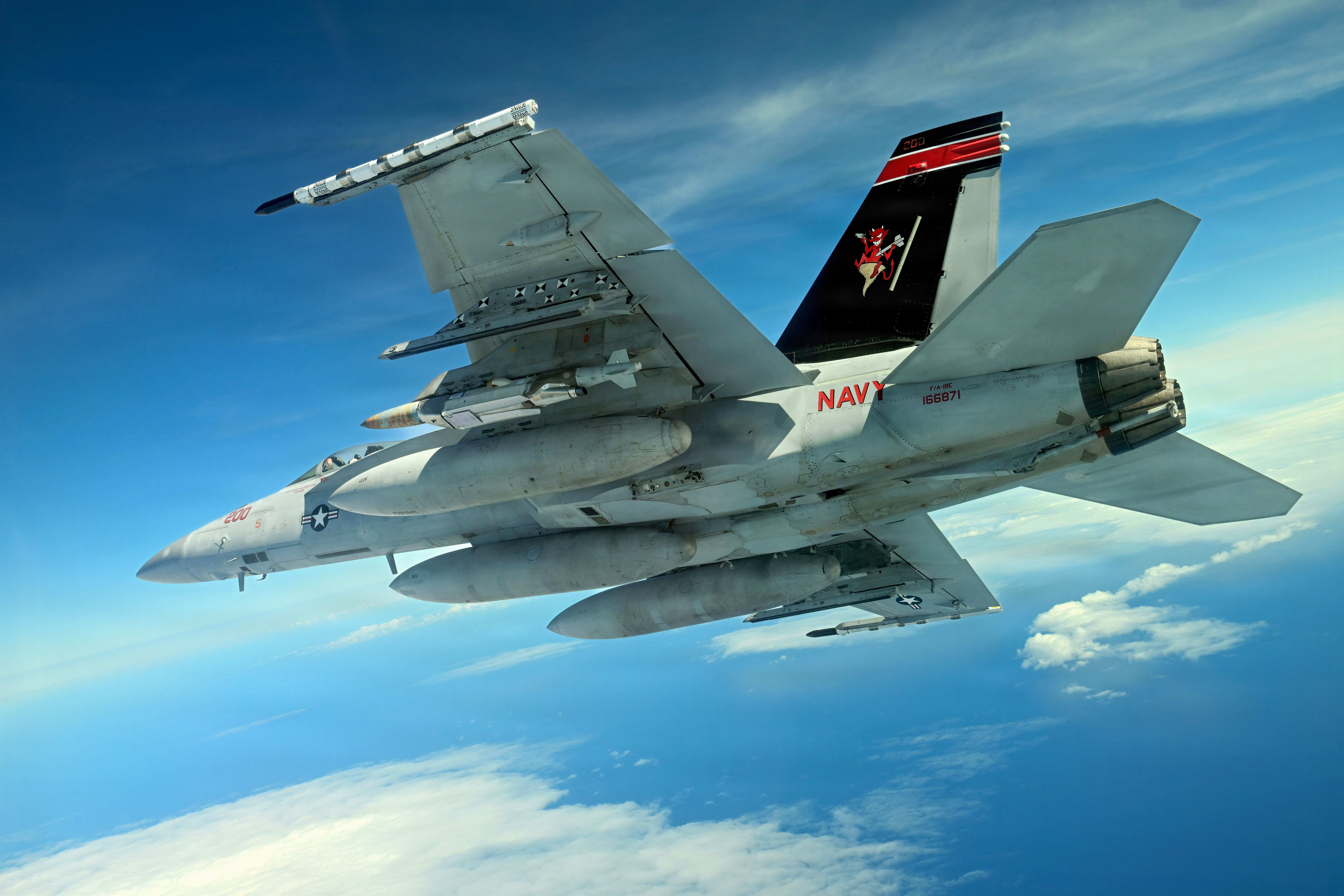
U.S. Navy F/A-18E carrying a GBU-75 JDAM-LR during a test in April, 2026

In 2010, Boeing proposed adding a jet engine tailkit to the JDAM-ER for 10 times greater range. The U.S. Air Force initially showed no interest in the concept, but by 2020 Boeing believed the service had regained interest in acquiring low-cost cruise missiles. The Powered JDAM has the range of more sophisticated missiles through a low-cost engine while being cheaper though not having a stealthy shape or the ability to conduct low-altitude flights. Though less survivable, Powered JDAMs could be networked to provide a cheap standoff weapon to overwhelm air defense systems.

The Powered JDAM (PJDAM) combines the 500 lb (230 kg) Mark 82 bomb and JDAM-ER wing kit with a TDI-J85 turbine engine developed by Technical Directions Inc. (TDI). The combination is believed to permit a range in excess of 330 nmi (610 km; 380 mi).

There is also a proposal to create a low cost air-launched decoy missile from the PJDAM. By substituting the Mark 82 bomb with an extended range fuel tank, it is assessed ranges in excess of 700 nmi (1,300 km; 810 mi) could be achieved by the decoy PJDAM.

In April 2026, the U.S. Navy announced its first tests of GBU-75 Joint Direct Attack Munition – Long Range (JDAM-LR) with two launches traveling 200 nautical miles to their targets off the coast of California.

On 5 August 2026, Boeing announced having received the first production contract for the GBU-75 JDAM-LR (formerly known as PJDAM), worth $75 million, awarded by the US Air Force.

On 26 August 2026, the Ukrainian Air Force was believed to have launched JDAM-LR missiles at a command post in Donetsk, based upon wreckage recovered. Colonel Andrey Vladimirovich Krestyansky killed in the strike, with OSINT discovering he was buried on 9 September 2026.

=== Anti-ship deployments ===
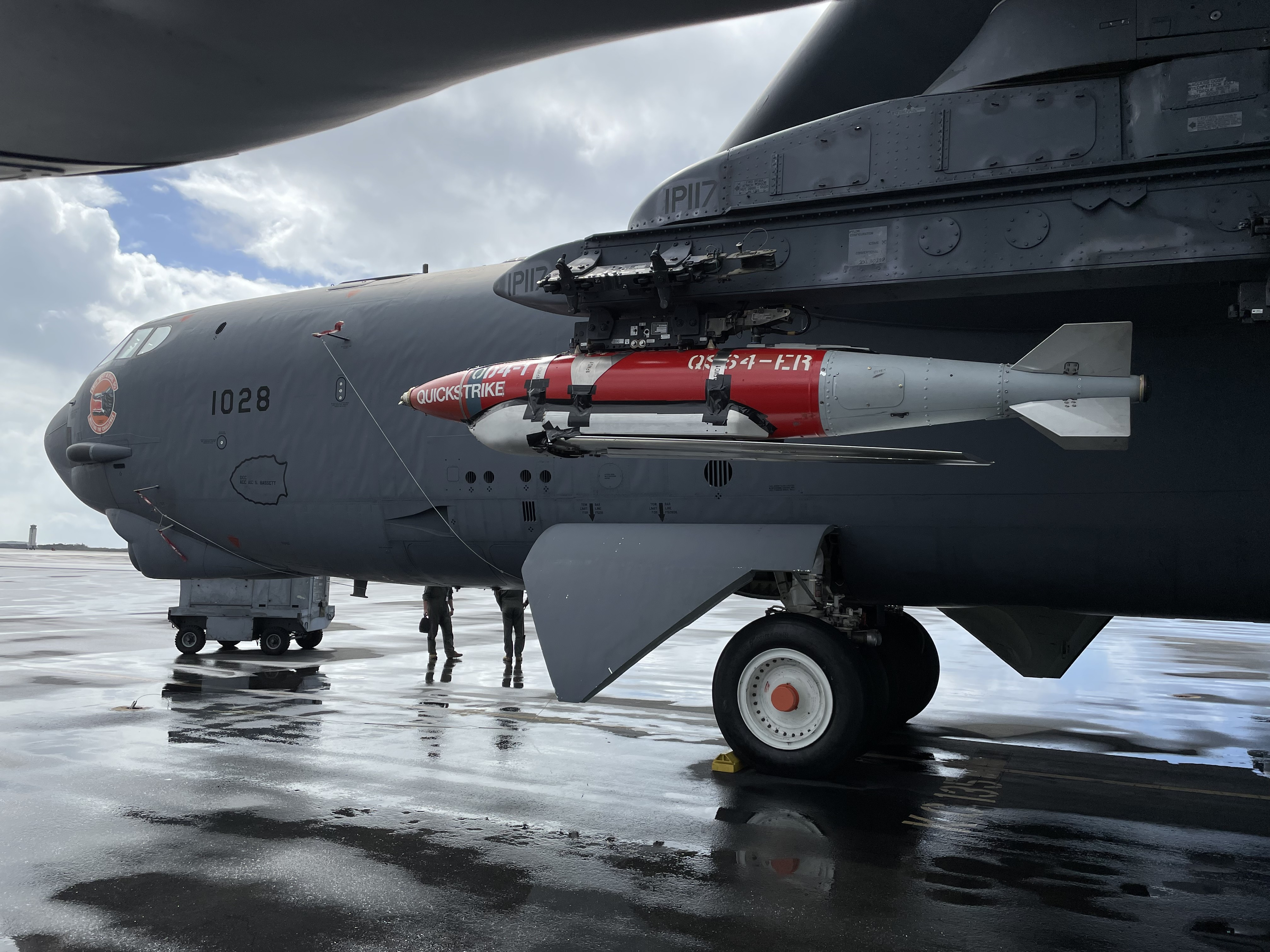
An inert JDAM Quickstrike Extended Range mine is attached to a U.S. Air Force B-52H Stratofortress

In September 2014, the U.S. Air Force performed the first-ever drop of a precision-guided aerial sea mine, consisting of a Quickstrike mine equipped with a JDAM kit. The Quickstrike is a Mark 80-series general-purpose bomb with the fuze replaced with a target detection device (TDD) to detonate it when a ship passes within lethal range, a safe/arm device in the nose, and a parachute-retarder tailkit in the back. Dropping of naval mines has historically been challenging, as the delivery aircraft has to fly low and slow, 500 ft (150 m) at 320 knots (370 mph; 590 km/h), making it vulnerable to hostile fire. The first aerial mining mission of Operation Desert Storm resulted in the loss of an aircraft, and the U.S. has not flown any combat aerial minings since.

The Quickstrike-J is a JDAM-equipped 1,000 lb (450 kg) or 2,000 lb (910 kg) version, and the GBU-62B(V-1)/B Quickstrike-ER is a 500 lb (230 kg) or 2,000 lb (910 kg) gliding version based on the JDAM-ER, which has a range of 40 nmi (46 mi; 74 km) when launched from 35,000 ft (11,000 m). Precision airdropping of naval mines is the first advance in aerial mine delivery techniques since World War II. It can increase the survivability of delivery aircraft, since instead of making multiple slow passes at low altitude directly over the area, an aircraft can release all of their mines in a single pass from a standoff distance and altitude. This increases the mines' effectiveness, since instead of laying a random pattern of mines in a loosely defined area, they can be laid directly into harbor mouths, shipping channels, canals, rivers, and inland waterways, reducing the number of mines required and enhancing the possibility of blocking ship transit corridors. Enemy naval ports can be blockaded, and a defensive minefield quickly planted to protect areas threatened by amphibious assault.

A direct-attack bomb version called "Quicksink" was tested in 2022, and were successfully used to sink USS Dubuque (LPD-8) and USS Tarawa (LHA-1) during the RIMPAC 2024 exercise. A 500 lb (230 kg) "Quicksink" variant, based on the GBU-38 JDAM, was tested in 2025.

== Variants ==
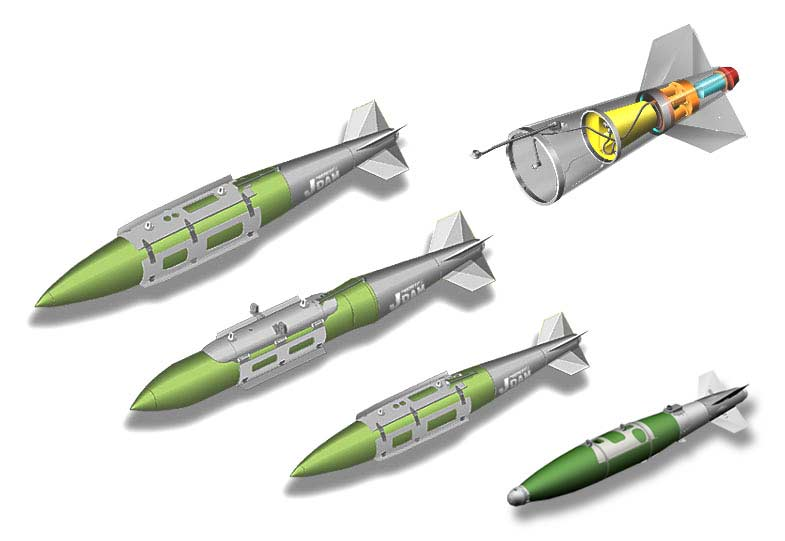
USAF artist rendering of JDAM kits fitted to Mk 84, BLU-109, Mk 83, and Mk 82 unguided bombs.

- 2,000 lb (910 kg) nominal weight
  - GBU-31(V)1/B (USAF) Mk 84
  - GBU-31(V)2/B (USN/USMC) Mk 84
  - GBU-31(V)3/B (USAF) BLU-109
  - GBU-31(V)4/B (USN/USMC) BLU-109
  - GBU-31(V)5/B (USAF) BLU-119/B
  - GBU-31v11: Guided BLU-136 cluster bomb replacement
  - GBU-64 JDAM-ER Mk 84
- 1,000 lb (450 kg) nominal weight
  - GBU-32(V)1/B (USAF) Mk 83
  - GBU-32(V)2/B (USN/USMC) Mk 83
  - GBU-35(V)1/B (USN/USMC) BLU-110
  - GBU-63 JDAM-ER Mk 83
- 500 lb (230 kg) nominal weight
  - GBU-38(V)1/B (USAF) Mk 82 and BLU-111
  - GBU-38(V)2/B (USN/USMC) Mk 82 and BLU-111
  - GBU-38(V)3/B (USAF) BLU-126/B
  - GBU-38(V)4/B (USN/USMC) BLU-126/B
  - GBU-38(V)5/B (USAF) BLU-129/B
  - GBU-54/B Laser JDAM Mk 82
  - GBU-62 JDAM-ER Mk 82
  - GBU-75 JDAM-LR Mk 82

=== Specifications ===
Bomb specifications
	GBU-38	GBU-54 LJDAM	GBU-62 JDAM-ER	GBU-75 JDAM-LR	GBU-32	GBU-55 LJDAM	GBU-63 JDAM-ER	GBU-31	GBU-56 LJDAM	GBU-64 JDAM-ER
Warhead	Mark 82				Mark 83			Mark 84 & BLU-109		
Launch weight	559 lb (253.6 kg)	575 / 591 lb (260.8 / 268 kg)	620 lb (280 kg)	Unknown	1,015 lb (460.5 kg)	1,047 lb (475 kg) est.	1,080 lb (490 kg)	2,040 / 2,120 lb (925.4 / 961.4 kg)	2,120 / 2,135 lb (961.6 / 968.4 kg)	2,180 lb (990 kg)
Length	7 ft 8.6 in (2.352 m)	7 ft 10 in (2.38 m)	Unknown	Unknown	9 ft 11.5 in (3.035 m)	10 ft (3.05 m) est.	Unknown	12 ft 9 in – 12 ft 5 in (3.879–3.774 m)	12 ft 8 in (3.85 m)	Unknown
Span	14 in (356 mm)	17 in (431.8 mm)	Unknown	Unknown	19.6 in (498 mm)		Unknown	25 in (635 mm)	25.3 in (642.6 mm)	Unknown
Lug spacing	14 in (356 mm)									
Guidance type	GPS, INS	GPS, INS, SAL	GPS, INS			GPS, INS, SAL	GPS, INS		GPS, INS, SAL	GPS, INS
Max range	13 nmi (24 km)		> 39.1 nmi (72.5 km)	> 330 nmi (611 km) est.	13 nmi (24 km)		39.1 nmi (72.5 km)	13 nmi (24 km)		39.1 nmi (72.5 km)
Accuracy (CEP)	GPS: 16 ft 5 in (5 m); INS: 98 ft 5 in (30 m)		Unknown		GPS: 16 ft 5 in (5 m); INS: 98 ft 5 in (30 m)		Unknown	GPS: 16 ft 5 in (5 m); INS: 98 ft 5 in (30 m)		Unknown

== Integration ==
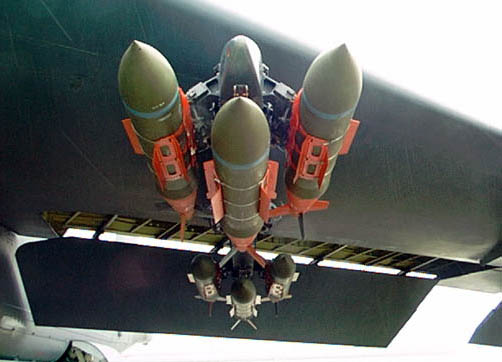
JDAMs loaded onto a Heavy Stores Adaptor Beam (HSAB) under the wing of a B-52H Stratofortress

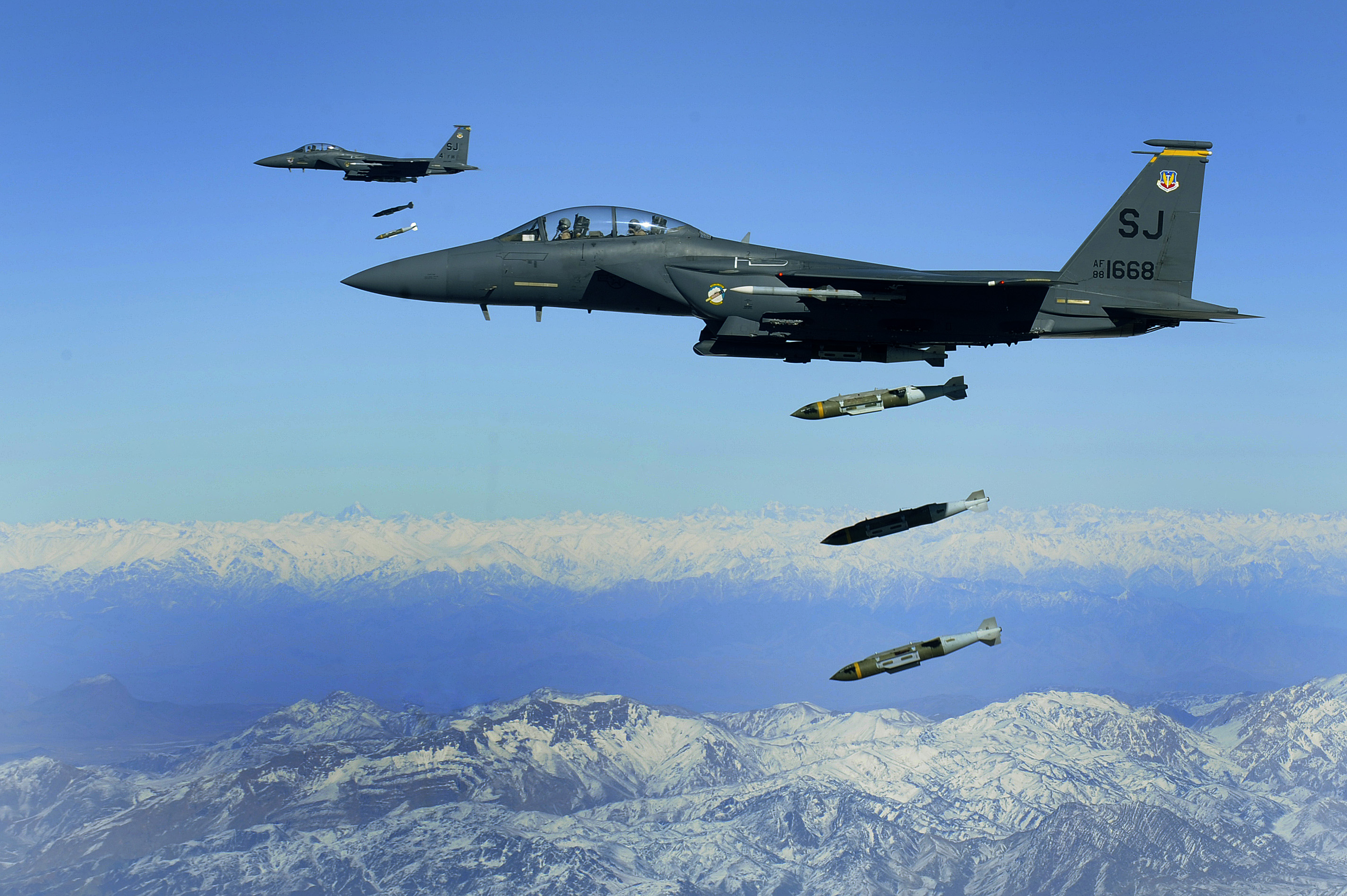
2,000 lb GBU-31s ripple drop in Afghanistan by two F-15Es, 2009.

=== Current ===
JDAM is currently compatible with:

- AV-8B Harrier II
- A-10 Thunderbolt II
- A-29 Super Tucano
- AMX International AMX
- B-1B Lancer
- B-2 Spirit
- B-52H Stratofortress
- F-15E Strike Eagle
- F-16AM/BM/C/D Fighting Falcon
- CF-18 Hornet
- F/A-18A+/A++/C/D Hornet
- F/A-18E/F Super Hornet
- F-22 Raptor
- F-35 Lightning II
- HAL Tejas
- KAI FA-50
- MQ-9 Reaper: integration in work as of 2015
- Mikoyan MiG-29: integration in work as of 2023 in Ukraine
- Mitsubishi F-2
- Panavia Tornado
- Saab JAS 39 Gripen
- Sukhoi Su-27: in service with Ukraine as of 2023

=== Past ===
JDAM was compatible with the following aircraft:

- F-14B/D Tomcat – retired
- F-117 Nighthawk – retired
- S-3 Viking – retired

== Operators ==
A map with JDAM operators in blue

=== Current operators ===
- Australia
- Belgium
- Canada: The Royal Canadian Air Force used their first JDAM during Operation Mobile in 2011.
- Chile
- Denmark
- Egypt
- Finland GBU-31V1, GBU-32 and GBU-38
- Germany: First international customer of the LJDAM
- Greece
- India
- Indonesia: 102 kits delivered as of 2020.
- Israel
- Italy: Between 900 and 1,000 GBU-31s and GBU-32s were produced in Italy for the Aeronautica Militare by Oto Melara
- Japan: + LJDAM
- Jordan
- Kuwait
- Malaysia
- Morocco
- Netherlands
- Norway
- Oman
- Pakistan
- Philippines
- Poland
- Portugal
- Romania
- Saudi Arabia
- Singapore
- Slovakia: Slovakia ordered 150 GBU-38, and 50 GBU-54 LJDAM kits, and these are being used on its F-16 Block 70s.
- South Korea
- Spain: Spanish Naval Air Arm EAV-8B+ (only GBU-38)
- Taiwan
- Turkey TUBITAK-SAGE Mk-84
- Ukraine: JDAM-ER
- United Arab Emirates
- United States

=== Future operators ===
- Bulgaria
- Argentina

== Similar systems ==
- AASM – (France)
- FT PGB – (China)
- HGK – (Turkey)
- HOPE/HOSBO – (Germany)
- KGGB – (South Korea)
- KGK – (Turkey)
- Paveway IV – (United Kingdom)
- SMKB – (Brazil)
- Spice – (Israel)
- Thunder – (United Arab Emirates, South Africa)
- UMPK – (Russia)

== See also ==
- GBU-39 Small Diameter Bomb – (United States)
- AGM-154 Joint Standoff Weapon – (United States)
- M1156 precision guidance kit – (United States)
- M982 Excalibur – (United States, Sweden)
- XM395 precision guided mortar munition – (United States)

== Bibliography ==
- Bonds, Ray and David Miller (2002-08-05). Illustrated Directory of Modern American Weapons. Zenith Imprint, 2002. ISBN 0-7603-1346-6.
- US Department of Defense. "Kosovo/Operation Allied Force After Action Report" (PDF). Archived from the original (PDF) on August 15, 2000.
- JDAM Press releases
