= Wide Area GPS Enhancement =

Wide Area GPS Enhancement (WAGE) is a method to increase the horizontal accuracy of the GPS encrypted P(Y) Code by adding additional range correction data to the satellite broadcast navigation message.

Per a 1997 article, the navigation message for each satellite is updated once daily or as needed. This daily update of each satellite navigation message contains the range corrections for all the satellites in the constellation. Thus, more timely range correction information would be available for each satellite, resulting in increased horizontal accuracy. Potential improvements to the system include simplifying the upload procedure, uploading the data more often, and adding more monitor stations for better range correction.

WAGE is available only to the Precise Positioning Service (PPS) or P(Y) Code receivers. It requires at least 12.5 minutes to obtain the most recent WAGE data. After that, the process of using the corrections data is automatic and transparent to the operator. Any time the receiver is on, it continually collects WAGE data (whether the WAGE mode is on or off). The receiver always uses the most recent WAGE data available to calculate position and it will not use the data that is over 6 hours old.

A 1996 evaluation using a PLGR (a 5-channel L2 GPS receiver) found no clear advantage to using WAGE in its then-current configuration. Its overall average error of 9.1 meters was worse than when WAGE was not used.

However, the specifications information for the Defense Advanced GPS Receiver, which has replaced the PLGR, lists its WAGE accuracy as better than 4.82 m, 95% Horizontal. PPS accuracy has improved beyond WAGE specification and accuracy improvement from WAGE is now negligible. Modern receivers & atomic clocks on a chip will also outperform WAGE. Some theorize that restrictions imposed by WAGE may limit precision for both C/A, P(Y), & WAGE users more than what it provides to WAGE users only.

The capability of WAGE has been superseded by Talon NAMATH. There is a push for WAGE users to upgrade to Talon NAMATH or move them to using P(Y) alone. This could lift WAGE restrictions & allow accuracy improvements for all users.

In October 2024, WAGE was turned off and broadcast of the range corrections ceased. The reason for this decision was because the accuracy improvement of WAGE was negligible, WAGE data upload slowed the ephemeris data upload process, and WAGE limited the constellation to only 31 satellites.

== Sources ==
- Talon NAMATH, Link 16, ZOAD, SBIR, and Other Code Words
- Wide Area GPS Enhancement (WAGE) Evaluation
- Orbit Determination and Satellite Navigation Crosslink Summer 2002.
