= AN/PSN-13 Defense Advanced GPS Receiver =

US military handheld GPS receiver

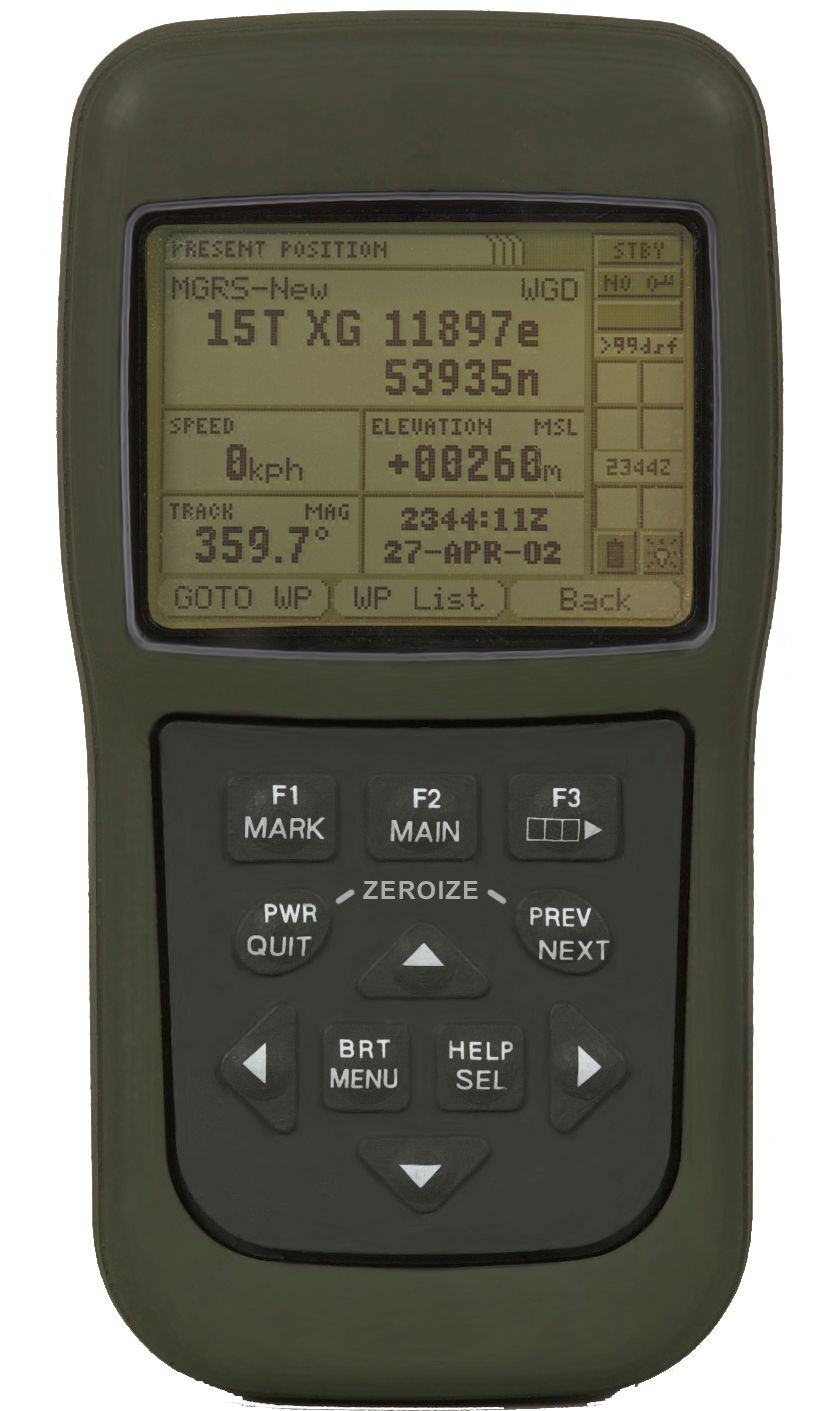
The Defense Advanced GPS Receiver (DAGR). Coordinates are for Rockwell Collins headquarters in Cedar Rapids, Iowa.

The AN/PSN-13 Defense Advanced GPS Receiver (DAGR; colloquially, "dagger") is a handheld GPS receiver used by the United States Department of Defense and select foreign military services. It is a military-grade, dual-frequency receiver, and has the security hardware necessary to decode the encrypted P(Y) code GPS signals.

Manufactured by Rockwell Collins, the DAGR entered production in March 2004, with the 40,000th unit delivered in September 2005. It was estimated by the news source Defense Industry Daily that, by the end of 2006, the USA and various allies around the world had issued almost $300 million worth of DAGR contracts, and ordered almost 125,000 units. The DAGR replaced the Precision Lightweight GPS Receiver (PLGR), which was first fielded in 1994.

Rockwell Collins also manufactures a GPS receiver known as the "Polaris Guide", that looks like a DAGR, but uses only the civilian C/A code signals. These units are labelled as "SPS", for "Standard Positioning Service", and may be possessed by non-military users.

In accordance with the Joint Electronics Type Designation System (JETDS), the "AN/PSN-13" designation represents the 13th design of an Army-Navy electronic device for portable radio navigation aid. The JETDS system also now is used to name all Department of Defense electronic systems.

== Features ==
- Graphical screen, with the ability to overlay map images.
- 12-channel continuous satellite tracking for "all-in-view" operation.
- Simultaneous L1/L2 dual frequency GPS signal reception.
- Capable of Direct-Y code acquisition
- Cold start first fix in less than 100 seconds.
- Extended performance in a diverse jamming environment.
  - 41 dB J/S maintaining state 5 tracking.
  - 24 dB during initial C/A code acquisition.
- Utilizes Receiver Autonomous Integrity Monitoring (RAIM).
- Selective Availability/Anti-Spoofing Module (SAASM) compatible (currently version 3.2).
- Wide Area GPS Enhancement (WAGE) compatible.
- Resistant to multi-path effects.
- Can be used as survey for weapons systems
- Fielded to the U.S. Army, U.S. Marine Corps, U.S. Navy, U.S. Air Force and select foreign military forces
- Designed to fit in a Battle Dress Uniform's 2-magazine ammo pouch
- Approximate cost to government per unit to acquire: $1,832

== Comparison to PLGR ==
Parameter	PLGR	DAGR
Introduced	1990	2004
Frequency bands	Dual (L1 & L2)	Dual (L1 & L2)
Security	PPS-SM	SAASM
Display	Text only	GUI with maps
Number of channels (satellites)	5	12 (all in view)
Anti-Jam resistance	24 dB	41 dB
Time to first fix (TTFF)	360 seconds	100 seconds
Time to subsequent fix (TTSF)	60 seconds	< 22 seconds
Weight	2.75 lb (1.25 kg)	0.94 lb (0.43 kg)
Dimensions (in inches)	9.5" tall, 4.1" wide, 2.6" thick	6.4" tall, 3.5" wide, 1.6" thick (Fits in 2-magazine ammo pouch)
Battery life	13 hours (8 batteries)	14 hours (4 batteries)
Reliability	2000 hours	5000 hours

== See also ==
- List of military electronics of the United States
- Moving map display
