= Chip (CDMA) =

Digital communications term

In digital communications, a chip is a pulse of a direct-sequence spread spectrum (DSSS) code, such as a pseudo-random noise (PN) code sequence used in direct-sequence code-division multiple access (CDMA) channel access techniques.

In a binary direct-sequence system, each chip is typically a rectangular pulse of +1 or −1 amplitude, which is multiplied by a data sequence (similarly +1 or −1 representing the message bits) and by a carrier waveform to make the transmitted signal. The chips are therefore just the bit sequence out of the code generator; they are called chips to avoid confusing them with message bits.

The chip rate of a code is the number of pulses per second (chips per second) at which the code is transmitted (or received). The chip rate is larger than the symbol rate, meaning that one symbol is represented by multiple chips. The ratio is known as the spreading factor (SF) or processing gain:

$$\mbox{SF} = \frac{\mbox{chip rate}}{\mbox{symbol rate}}$$

== Orthogonal variable spreading factor ==
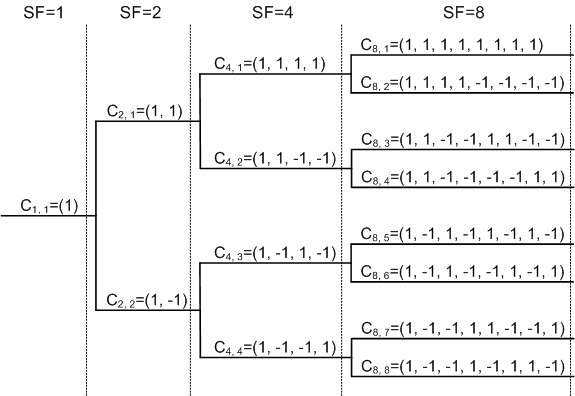
OVSF code tree

Orthogonal variable spreading factor (OVSF) is an implementation of code-division multiple access (CDMA) where before each signal is transmitted, the signal is spread over a wide spectrum range through the use of a user's code. Users' codes are carefully chosen to be mutually orthogonal to each other.

These codes are derived from an OVSF code tree, and each user is given a different code. An OVSF code tree is a complete binary tree that reflects the construction of Hadamard matrices.

== See also ==
- Baud
- GPS signals
