= Thunder (missile) =

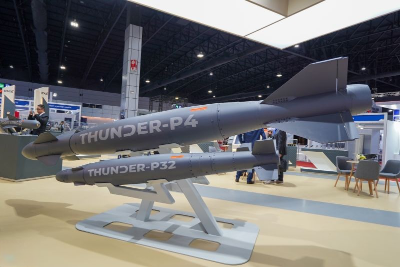
- Thunder missiles family displayed at Dubai Airshow
- Type: Precision-Guided Munition
- Place of origin: United Arab Emirates / South Africa

Service history
- In service: 2021–present
- Used by: United Arab Emirates Air Force

Production history
- Designer: Halcon Systems / Denel Dynamics
- Manufacturer: Halcon Systems
- Variants: See Variants

Thunder formerly known as p3 (Air-launched missile) is a family of Precision-Guided Munition guided by Global Positioning System and laser-guided pointing, manufactured by Halcon Systems a subsidiary of EDGE Group.

== Variants ==
- Thunder P31 (MK-81 bomb)
- Thunder P32 (MK-82 bomb)
- Thunder P4 (MK-84 bomb)

== Users ==
- United Arab Emirates In 2021, Halcon signed with UAE air force to deliver Thunder system and Desert Sting to the armed forces worth $880 million (AED3.2 billion)
