= Selective availability anti-spoofing module =

Feature of the Global Positioning System

A Selective Availability Anti-spoofing Module (SAASM) is used by military Global Positioning System receivers to allow decryption of precision GPS observations, while the accuracy of civilian GPS receivers may be reduced by the United States military through Selective Availability (SA) and anti-spoofing (AS). However, on May 1, 2000 it was announced that SA was being discontinued, along with a United States Presidential Directive that no future GPS programs will include it. Before the advent of L2C, AS was meant to prevent access to dual-frequency observations to civilian users.

SAASM allows satellite authentication, over-the-air rekeying, and contingency recovery. Those features are not available with the similar, but older, PPS-SM (Precise Positioning Service Security Module) system. PPS-SM systems require periodic updates with a classified "Red Key" that may only be transmitted by secure means (such as physically taking the receiver to a secure facility for rekeying or having a trusted courier deliver a paper tape with a new key to the receiver, after which that paper tape must be securely destroyed). SAASM systems can be updated with an encrypted "Black Key" that may be transmitted over unclassified channels. All military receivers newly deployed after the end of September 2006 must use SAASM.

SAASM does not provide any additional anti-jam capability, however, the higher data (chipping) rate of P(Y) code can provide a higher processing gain which will provide better tracking performance in a jamming environment. Future GPS upgrades, such as M-Code, will provide additional improvements to anti-jam capabilities.

SAASM hardware is covered with an anti-tampering coating, to deter analysis of their internal operation.

Deployment of the next generation military signal for GPS, called M-code, commenced with the launch of IIR-M and IIF satellites, beginning in 2005. A complete constellation of 18 satellites with M-code capability is planned for 2016.

== See also ==
- Defense Advanced GPS Receiver
- Precision Lightweight GPS Receiver
