= Precision Lightweight GPS Receiver =

Military handheld GPS system

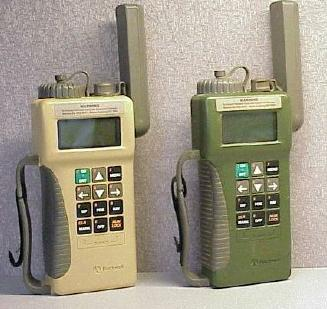
Two PLGRs, showing different color schemes.

The AN/PSN-11 Precision Lightweight GPS Receiver (PLGR, colloquially "plugger") is a ruggedized, hand-held, single-frequency GPS receiver fielded by the United States Armed Forces. It incorporates the Precise Positioning Service — Security Module (PPS-SM) to access the encrypted P(Y) code GPS signal.

== History ==
Introduced in January 1990, and extensively fielded until 2004 when it was replaced by its successor, the Defense Advanced GPS Receiver (DAGR). In that time period more than 165,000 PLGRs were procured worldwide, and despite being superseded by the DAGR, large numbers remain in unit inventories and it continues to be the most widely used GPS receiver in the United States military.

== Sizing ==
The PLGR measures 9.5 by 4.1 by 2.6 inches (24 cm × 10 cm × 7 cm) and weighs 2.75 pounds (1.25 kg) with batteries. It was originally delivered to the United States military with a six-year warranty; however, this was extended to ten years in June 2000.

== Versions ==
- AN/PSN-11 — NSN 5825-01-374-6643, an early version (tan case)
- AN/PSN-11(V)1 "Enhanced PLGR" — NSN 5825-01-395-3513, an upgraded version (green case)

== See also ==
- Defense Advanced GPS Receiver
- Joint Electronics Type Designation System – Unclassified designation system for United States military electronic equipment
- List of military electronics of the United States
- Moving map display
- Selective availability anti-spoofing module
