= Flight procedure =

A flight procedure or instrumental flight procedure (IFP) is a set of predetermined maneuvers with specified protection from obstacles designed to achieve safe flight operations and an orderly flow of air traffic. Flight procedures linked to an aerodrome are specified as arrival, departure or approach procedure (usually linked with missed approach procedure).

Different types of instrumental flight procedures can be recognized:

- STAR (standard terminal arrival route)
- SID (standard instrument departure)
- IAP (instrument approach procedure) - supports landing operation, usually starts in range of 10 to 20 NM before the runway threshold
- MA (missed approach procedure) - usually linked to IAP procedure and published on the same chart

== See also ==
- Aviation regulations
- Instrument flight rules
- Instrument approach
- Approach plate
- Flight planning
