= Lateral navigation =

Aircraft navigation in the horizontal plane

In aviation, lateral navigation (LNAV, usually pronounced el-nav) is azimuth navigation, without vertical navigation (VNAV). Area navigation (RNAV) approach plates include LNAV as a non-precision instrument approach (NPA). When combined with VNAV, the resulting instrument approach, LNAV/VNAV, is referred to as an Approach with Vertical Guidance (APV).

== Instrument approaches ==
An LNAV approach is flown to a Minimum Descent Altitude, MDA, while an LNAV/VNAV approach is flown to a Decision Altitude, DA. If WAAS becomes unavailable, a GPS or WAAS equipped aircraft can revert to the LNAV MDA using GPS only.

== Autopilots ==
LNAV is also the name of an autopilot lateral (roll) mode on several aircraft. In Boeing aircraft, when in LNAV mode, the autopilot will follow the lateral flight path programmed in to the Flight Management Computer.

== See also ==
- Index of aviation articles
- LPV
- Navigation
