= Required navigation performance =

Path selection method for aircraft

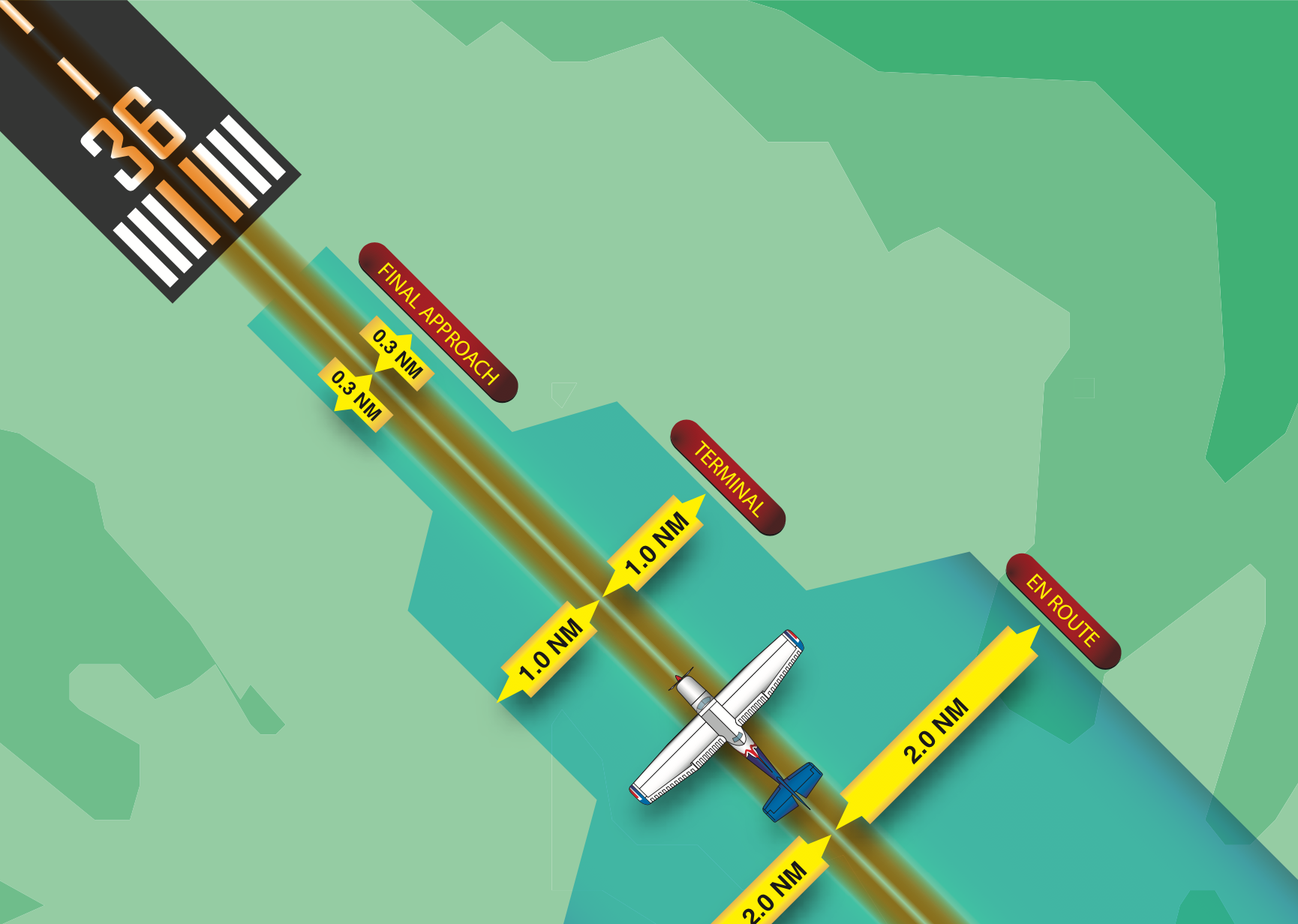
Required Navigation Performance provides a specified level of navigational accuracy for the airspace or stage of flight an aircraft is operating in

Required navigation performance (RNP) is a type of performance-based navigation (PBN) that allows an aircraft to fly a specific path between two 3D-defined points in space.

== Navigation precision ==
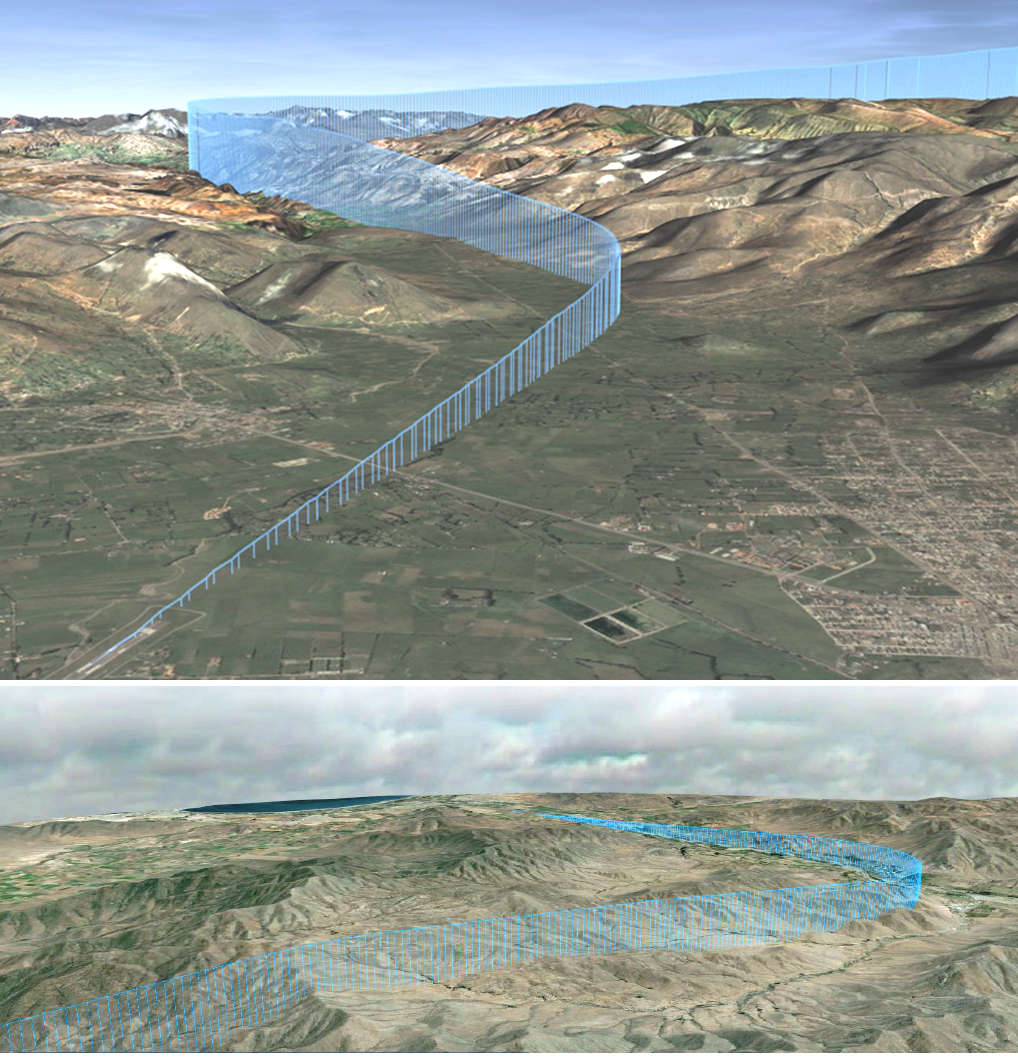
RNP-AR 3D approach tracks to Cajamarca, Peru (above) and La Serena, Chile (below), demonstrating the benefits of precise lateral and vertical navigation on airports located on mountainous regions

Area navigation (RNAV) and RNP systems are fundamentally similar. The key difference between them is the requirement for on-board performance monitoring and alerting. A navigation specification that includes a requirement for on-board navigation performance monitoring and alerting is referred to as an RNP specification. One not having such a requirement is referred to as an RNAV specification. Therefore, if ATC radar monitoring is not provided, safe navigation in respect to terrain shall be self-monitored by the pilot and RNP shall be used instead of RNAV.

RNP also refers to the level of performance required for a specific procedure or a specific block of airspace. An RNP of 10 means that a navigation system must be able to calculate its position to within a circle with a radius of 10 nautical miles. An RNP of 0.3 means the aircraft navigation system must be able to calculate its position to within a circle with a radius of 3/10 of a nautical mile. The differences in these systems are typically a function of on-board navigational system redundancies.

A related term is ANP which stands for "actual navigation performance." ANP refers to the current performance of a navigation system while "RNP" refers to the accuracy required for a given block of airspace or a specific instrument procedure.

Some oceanic airspace has an RNP capability value of 4 or 10. The level of RNP an aircraft is capable of determines the separation required between aircraft with respect to distance. Improved accuracy of on-board RNP systems represent a significant advantage to traditional non-radar environments, since the number of aircraft that can fit into a volume of airspace at any given altitude is a square of the number of required separation; that is to say, the lower the RNP value, the lower the required distance separation standards, and in general, the more aircraft can fit into a volume of airspace without losing required separation. This is not only a major advantage for air traffic operations, but presents a major cost-savings opportunity for airlines flying over the oceans due to less restrictive routing and better available altitudes.

RNP approaches with RNP values currently down to 0.1 allow aircraft to follow precise three-dimensional curved flight paths through congested airspace, around noise sensitive areas, or through difficult terrain.

== History ==
RNP procedures were introduced in the PANS-OPS (ICAO Doc 8168), which became applicable in 1998. These RNP procedures were the predecessor of the current PBN concept, whereby the performance for operation on the route is defined (in lieu of flight elements such as flyover procedures, variability in flight paths, and added airspace buffer), but they resulted in no significant design advantages. As a result, there was a lack of benefits to the user community and little or no implementation.

In 1996, Alaska Airlines became the first airline in the world to utilize an RNP approach with its approach down the Gastineau Channel into Juneau, Alaska. Alaska Airlines Captain Steve Fulton and Captain Hal Anderson developed more than 30 RNP approaches for the airline's Alaska operations. In 2005, Alaska Airlines became the first airline to utilize RNP approaches into Reagan National Airport to avoid congestion. In April 2009, Alaska Airlines became the first airline to gain approval from the FAA to validate their own RNP approaches. On 6 April 2010, Southwest Airlines converted to RNP.

Since 2009, regulators in Peru, Chile, and Ecuador have deployed more than 25 RNP AR approach procedures, designed in conjunction with LAN Airlines. Benefits included reduction in greenhouse gases emissions and improved accessibility to airports located on mountainous terrain. The use of RNP AR approaches in Cusco, near Machu Picchu, has reduced cancellations due to foul weather by 60 percent on flights operated by LAN.

In 2011, Boeing, Lion Air, and the Indonesian Directorate General of Civil Aviation performed validation flights to test tailor-made Required Navigation Performance Authorization Required (RNP AR) procedures at two terrain-challenged airports, Ambon and Manado, pioneering the use of RNP precision navigation technology in Southeast Asia.

=== Established on RNP approaches ===
Inspired by a 2011 white paper written by Sheila Conway, in November 2018 the ICAO published the Established on RNP-Authorization Required (EoR) standard to reduce separation for parallel runways, improving traffic flow while reducing noise, emissions and distance flown. Conservative estimates of CO_{2} emissions savings due to EoR operations at Denver International Airport exceed 1 billion tons as of 2024. Similar to Denver, it was implemented over three years at Calgary International Airport, lowering the final approach requirement from 20 to 4 mi (32.2 to 6.4 km), before reaching trajectory-based operations. As 40% of aircraft arriving are equipped to fly RNP-AR, 3,000 RNP-AR approaches per month would save 33,000 miles (53,000 km), and associated with continuous descent, would reduce greenhouse gases emissions by 2,500 metric tons in the first year.

== Description ==
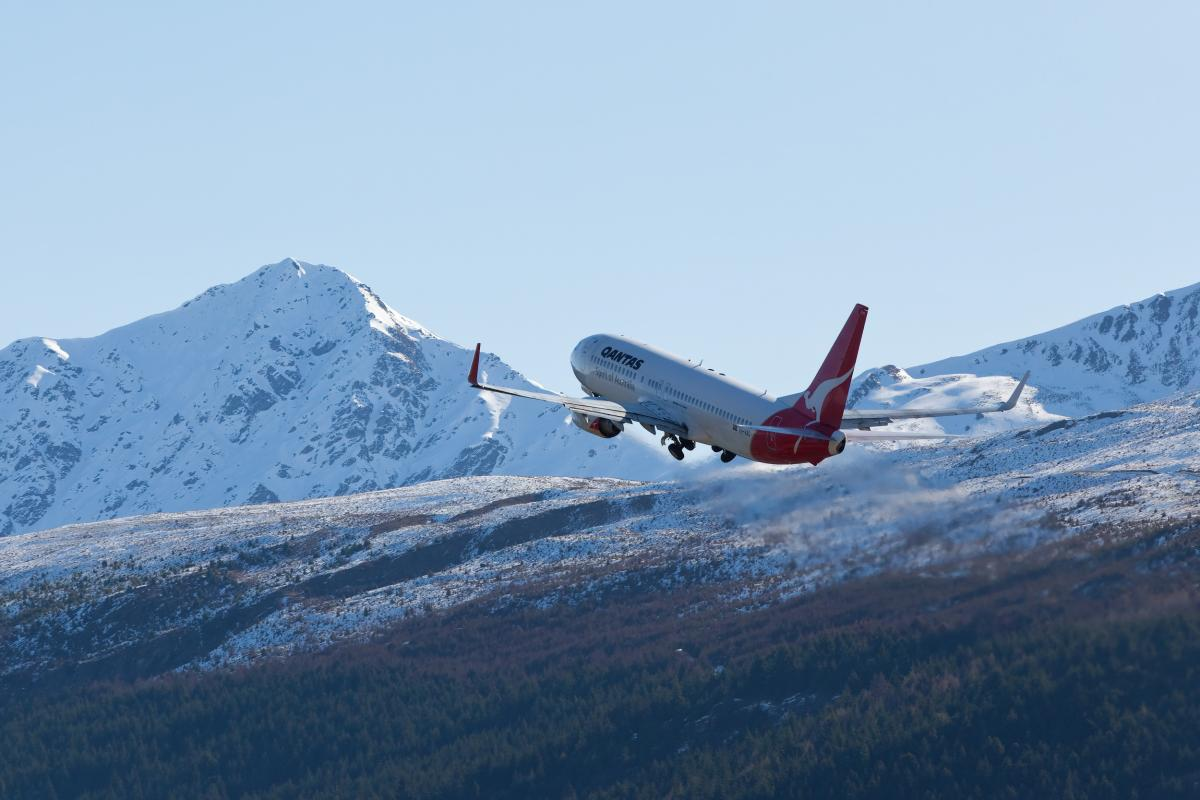
Qantas Boeing 737-800 flying RNP departure from Queenstown, New Zealand

=== Capabilities ===
The current specific requirements of an RNP system include:

- Capability to follow a desired ground track with reliability, repeatability, and predictability, including curved paths; and
- Where vertical profiles are included for vertical guidance, use of vertical angles or specific altitude constraints to define a desired vertical path.

RNP APCH supports all leg types and path terminators used in standard RNAV, including TF and RF. RNP AR procedures support only two leg types:

- TF leg: Track to Fix: a geodesic path between two fixes.
- RF leg: Radius to Fix. This is a curved path supported by positive course guidance. An RF leg is defined by a radius, arc length, and a fix. Not all RNP capable FMS systems support RF legs. Use of RF legs is allowed prior to the Final Approach Fix. For RNP AR APCH operation see Special Aircraft and Aircrew Authorization Required approach section below.

The performance-monitoring and alerting capabilities may be provided in different forms depending on the system installation, architecture, and configurations, including:

- display and indication of both the required and the estimated navigation system performance;
- monitoring of the system performance and alerting the crew when RNP requirements are not met; and
- cross track deviation displays scaled to RNP, in conjunction with separate monitoring and alerting for navigation integrity.

=== Error tolerance ===
An RNP system utilises its navigation sensors, system architecture, and modes of operation to satisfy the RNP navigation specification requirements. It must perform the integrity and reasonableness checks of the sensors and data, and it may provide a means to deselect specific types of navigation aids to prevent reversion to an inadequate sensor.

The RNP type defines the total system error that is allowed in lateral and longitudinal dimensions within a particular airspace. The total system error, which takes account of navigation system errors, computation errors, display errors and flight technical errors, must not exceed the specified RNP value for 95 percent of the flight time on any part of any single flight. RNP requirements may limit the modes of operation of the aircraft, e.g. for low RNP, where flight technical errors is a significant factor, and manual flight by the crew may not be allowed. Dual system/sensor installations may also be required depending on the intended operation or need.

=== RNP system ===
An RNAV system capable of achieving the performance requirements of an RNP specification, including monitoring and alerting of Actual Navigation Performance, is referred to as an RNP system. Because specific performance requirements are defined for each navigation specification, an aircraft approved for a RNP specification is not automatically approved for all RNAV specifications. Similarly, an aircraft approved for an RNP or RNAV specification having stringent accuracy requirements is not automatically approved for a navigation specification having a less-stringent accuracy requirement.

== Designation ==
For oceanic, remote, enroute and terminal operations, an RNP specification is designated as RNP X, e.g. RNP 4. (Note: The expression 'X' (where stated) refers to the lateral navigation accuracy in nautical miles, which is expected to be achieved at least 95% of the flight time by the population of aircraft operating within the airspace, route or procedure) (Note: The existing RNP 10 designation is inconsistent with PBN RNP and RNAV specifications. RNP 10 does not include requirements for on-board performance monitoring and alerting. For purposes of consistency with the PBN concept, RNP 10 is referred to as RNAV 10. Renaming current RNP 10 routes, operational approvals, etc. to an RNAV 10 designation would be an extensive and expensive task, which is not cost-effective. Consequently, any existing or new operational approvals will continue to be designated RNP 10, and any charting annotations will be depicted as RNP 10.)

Approach navigation specifications cover all segments of the instrument approach. RNP specifications are designated using RNP as a prefix and an abbreviated textual suffix, e.g. RNP APCH (for RNP approach) or RNP AR APCH (for RNP authorisation required approach).

== Performance monitoring and alerting requirements ==
The performance monitoring and alerting requirements for RNP 4, Basic-RNP 1 and RNP APCH have common terminology and application. Each of these specifications includes requirements for the following characteristics:

- Accuracy: The accuracy requirement defines the 95% Total System Error (TSE) for those dimensions where an accuracy requirement is specified. The accuracy requirement is harmonised with the RNAV navigation specifications and is always equal to the accuracy value. A unique aspect of the RNP navigation specifications is that the accuracy is one of the performance characteristics that is monitored.
- Performance monitoring: The aircraft, or aircraft-and-pilot combination, is required to monitor the TSE and to provide an alert if the accuracy requirement is not met or if the probability that the TSE exceeds two-times the accuracy value is larger than 10^{−5}. To the extent operational procedures are used to satisfy this requirement, the crew procedure, equipment characteristics, and installation are evaluated for their effectiveness and equivalence.
- Aircraft failures: Failure of the aircraft equipment is considered within airworthiness regulations. Failures are categorised by the severity of the aircraft level effect, and the system must be designed to reduce the likelihood of the failure or mitigate its effects. Both malfunction (equipment operating but not providing appropriate output) and loss of function (equipment ceases to function) are addressed. Dual system requirements are determined based on operational continuity (e.g. oceanic and remote operations). The requirements on aircraft failure characteristics are not unique to RNP navigation specifications.
- Signal-in-space failures: Signal-in-space characteristics of navigation signals are the responsibility of the ANSP.

The net effect of RNP navigation specifications is to provide bounding of the TSE distribution. Since path definition error is assumed to be negligible, the monitoring requirement is reduced to the other two components of TSE, i.e. flight technical error (FTE) and navigation system error (NSE). It is assumed that FTE is an ergodic (Note: An ergodic process is one in which every sequence or sizable sample is equally representative of the whole. It is realised that this is not necessarily true for all operations envisaged by RNAV and RNP systems, especially where manual operation is involved, but when averaged over a large number of operations this assumption becomes valid.) stochastic process within a given flight control mode. As a result, the FTE distribution is constant over time within a given flight control mode. However, in contrast, the NSE distribution varies over time due to a number of changing characteristics, most notably:

- Selected navigation sensors: The navigation sensors used to estimate position, such as a Global Navigation Satellite System (GNSS) or DME/DME. (Note: A waypoint can be defined as the intersection of two vectors, each being a stated distance from a known position.)
- Relative geometry of the aircraft position to the supporting navigation aids: All radio navaids have this basic variability, although the specific characteristics change. GNSS performance is affected by the relative geometry of the satellites compared to the aircraft. (Note: Lines of position should be well distributed in space to support good resolution in space and time.) DME/DME navigation solutions are affected by the inclusion angle between the two DMEs at the aircraft (90° being optimal) and the distance to the DMEs, since the aircraft DME transponder can have increasing range errors with increasing distance.
- Inertial reference units: Errors increase over time since last updated.

== Application of performance monitoring and alerting to aircraft ==
Although the TSE can change significantly over time for a number of reasons, including those above, the RNP navigation specifications provide assurance that the TSE distribution remains suitable to the operation. This results from two requirements associated with the TSE distribution, namely:

- The requirement that the TSE remains equal to or better than the required accuracy for 95% of the flight time.
- The probability that the TSE of each aircraft exceeds the specified TSE limit (equal to two times the accuracy value) without annunciation is less than 10^{−5}.

Typically, the 10^{−5} TSE requirement provides a greater restriction on performance. For example, with any system that has TSE with a normal distribution of cross-track error, the 10^{−5} monitoring requirement constrains the standard deviation to be 2 × (accuracy value)/4.45 = accuracy value/2.23, while the 95% requirement would have allowed the standard deviation to be as large as the accuracy value/1.96.

These characteristics define minimum requirements that must be met, but they do not define the actual TSE distribution. The actual TSE distribution may be expected to be typically better than the requirement, but there must be evidence on the actual performance if a lower TSE value is to be used.

In applying the performance monitoring requirement to aircraft, there can be significant variability in how individual errors are managed:

- Some systems monitor the actual cross-track and along-track errors individually, whereas others monitor the radial NSE to simplify the monitoring and eliminate dependency on the aircraft track, e.g. based on typical elliptical 2-D error distributions.
- Some systems include the FTE in the monitor by taking the current value of FTE as a bias on the TSE distribution.
- For basic GNSS systems, the accuracy and 10^{−5} requirements are met as a by-product of the ABAS requirements that have been defined in equipment standards and the FTE distribution for standardised course deviation indicator (CDI) displays.

It is important that performance monitoring is not regarded as error monitoring. A performance monitoring alert will be issued when the system cannot guarantee, with sufficient integrity, that the position meets the accuracy requirement. When such an alert is issued, the probable reason is the loss of capability to validate the position data (insufficient satellites being a potential reason). For such a situation, the most likely position of the aircraft at that time is exactly the same position indicated on the pilot display. Assuming the desired track has been flown correctly, the FTE would be within the required limits and therefore the likelihood of the TSE exceeding twice the accuracy value just prior to the alert is approximately 10^{−5}. However, it cannot be assumed that simply because there is no alert the TSE is less than twice the accuracy value: the TSE can be larger. An example is for those aircraft that account for the FTE based on a fixed error distribution. For such systems, if the FTE grows large, no alert is issued by the system even when the TSE is many times larger than the accuracy value. For this reason, the operational procedures to monitor the FTE are important.

== Areas of operation ==
=== Oceanic and remote continental ===
Oceanic and remote continental airspace is currently served by two navigation applications, RNAV 10 and RNP 4. Both rely primarily on GNSS to support the navigation element of the airspace. In the case of RNAV 10, no form of ATS surveillance is required. In the case of RNP 4, ADS contract (ADS-C) is used.

=== Continental en-route ===
Continental en-route airspace is currently supported by RNAV applications. RNAV 5 is used in the Middle East (MID) and European (EUR) regions, but as of 2008, it is designated as B-RNAV (Basic RNAV in Europe and RNP 5 in the Middle East). In the United States, RNAV 2 supports en-route continental airspace. At present, continental RNAV applications support airspace specifications which include radar surveillance and direct controller-to-pilot voice communications.

=== Terminal airspace: arrival and departure ===
Existing terminal airspace concepts, which include arrival and departure, are supported by RNAV applications. These are currently used in the European (EUR) Region and the United States. The European terminal airspace RNAV application is known as P-RNAV (Precision RNAV). Although the RNAV 1 specification shares a common navigation accuracy with P-RNAV, this regional navigation specification does not satisfy the full requirements of the RNAV 1 specification. As of 2008, the United States terminal airspace application formerly known as US RNAV Type B has been aligned with the PBN concept and is now called RNAV 1. Basic RNP 1 has been developed primarily for application in non-radar, low density terminal airspace. In future, more RNP applications are expected to be developed for both en-route and terminal airspace.

=== Approach ===
Approach concepts cover all segments of the instrument approach, i.e. initial, intermediate, final, and missed approach. The RNP APCH specifications requiring a standard navigation accuracy of 1.0 NM in the initial, intermediate and missed segments and 0.3 NM in the final segment. Typically, three sorts of RNP applications are characteristic of this phase of flight: new procedures to runways never served by an instrument procedure, procedures either replacing or serving as backup to existing instrument procedures based on different technologies, and procedures developed to enhance airport access in demanding environments (RNP APCH and RNP AR APCH).

RNP approaches to 0.3 NM and 0.1 NM at Queenstown Airport in New Zealand are the primary approaches used by Qantas and Air New Zealand for both international and domestic services. Due to terrain restrictions, ILS approaches are not possible, and conventional VOR/DME approaches have descent restrictions more than 2,000 ft above the airport level. The RNP approaches and departures follow curved paths below terrain level.

==== Special Aircraft and Aircrew Authorization Required approach ====
RNP instrument approach procedures with Authorization Required or RNP AR (previously known as Special Aircraft and Aircrew Authorization Required or SAAAR) approach procedures build upon the performance based NAS concept. The performance requirements to conduct an approach are defined, and aircraft are qualified against these performance requirements. Conventional obstacle evaluation areas for ground-based navigation aids are based on a predefined aircraft capability and navigation system. RNP AR criteria for obstacle evaluation are flexible and designed to adapt to unique operational environments. This allows approach specific performance requirements as necessary for an approach procedure. The operational requirement can include avoiding terrain and obstacles, de-conflicting airspace or resolving environmental constraints.

RNP AR APCH is defined as an RNP approach procedure that requires a lateral TSE lower than the standard RNP values on any segment of the approach procedure. RNP approaches include capabilities that require special aircraft and aircrew authorization similar to category II/III ILS operations. All RNP AR approaches have reduced lateral obstacle evaluation areas and vertical obstacle clearance surfaces predicated on the aircraft and aircrew performance requirements. The following characteristics differ from RNP APCH:

- RF leg segments may be used after PFAF (precise final approach fix).
- lateral TSE values as low as 0.10 NM on any segment of the approach procedure (initial, intermediate, final or missed).

When conducting an RNP AR approach using a line of minima less than RNP 0.3, no single-point-of-failure can cause the loss of guidance compliant with the RNP value associated with the approach. Typically, the aircraft must have at least dual GNSS sensors, dual flight management systems, dual air data systems, dual autopilots, and a single inertial reference unit.

When conducting an RNP AR approach with a missed approach less than RNP 1.0, no single-point-of-failure can cause the loss of guidance compliant with the RNP value associated with a missed approach procedure. Typically, the aircraft must have at least dual GNSS sensors, dual flight management systems, dual air data systems, dual autopilots, and a single inertial reference unit.

== Flight planning ==
Manual or automated notification of an aircraft's qualification to operate along an air traffic services (ATS) route, on a procedure or in an airspace is provided to ATC via the flight plan.

== See also ==
- Acronyms and abbreviations in avionics
- Index of aviation articles
