= Cold temperature airport =

Non precision approach procedure flight path varies for the same altimeter setting under different temperatures, risking obstacle collision. Standard temperature flight path Cold temperature flight path

In aviation, a cold temperature airport or cold temperature restricted airport is an airport at risk of loss of required obstacle clearance during an instrument approach due to cold temperature.

In the United States, a cold temperature airport may be identified by a snowflake icon placed on its instrument approach procedure chart(s).

== Principle ==
An aircraft's barometric altimeter is corrected only for the air pressure under International Standard Atmosphere condition. When the ambient (at altitude) temperature is colder than the International Standard Atmosphere condition, the aircraft's true altitude is lower than the indicated barometric altitude, bringing pilots closer to obstacles than where they think they are. Consequently, the obstacle clearance actually achieved is less than required obstacle clearance.

== History ==
In 1990s, the aviation industry raised the problem that aircraft would fly dangerously close to the terrain under extremely cold temperature. United States Federal Aviation Administration (FAA) partnered with Mitre Corporation in a study to create a systematic approach to identify parts of instrument approach procedures threatened by obstacles in low temperatures for airports with runways of at least 2,500 ft (760 m) in the United States. Several hundred airports were identified in the study, forming a list of Cold Temperature Restricted Airports. In September 2015, The temperature correction procedure became mandatory for all operations except for military airfields.

As of September 2025, the United States has 183 designated civilian cold temperature airports, and 10 military airfields that satisfy the cold temperature airport criteria.

== Criteria ==
To qualify as a cold temperature airport, an airport is first assessed based on its historical temperature data and its required obstacle clearance. If there is more than 1% chance that a pilot may be unable to maintain the required obstacle clearance in an approach segment, the approach segment gets assigned a temperature restriction. These restrictions typically impact airports at higher elevations and extreme cold climates.

== Temperature correction ==
Pilots are responsible for accounting for the impact of extreme cold temperature during the planning stage of the flight. This is achieved by manually adding temperature corrections to published minimum altitudes/heights in instrument approach procedures based on the reported temperature near estimated arrival time and height above the airport. FAA recommends pilots to apply the temperature correction to either individual segments identified for additional temperature restriction or the entire instrument approach procedure, while International Civil Aviation Organization mandates that such correction be applied to "all published minimum altitudes/heights in both conventional and PBN procedures."

ICAO Cold temperature error table
	Height above airport (ft)													
Reported temperature (°C)	200	300	400	500	600	700	800	900	1000	1500	2000	3000	4000	5000
+10	10	10	10	10	20	20	20	20	20	30	40	60	80	90
0	20	20	30	30	40	40	50	50	60	90	120	170	230	280
-10	20	30	40	50	60	70	80	90	100	150	200	290	390	490
-20	30	50	60	70	90	100	120	130	140	210	280	420	570	710
-30	40	60	80	100	120	140	150	170	190	280	380	570	760	950
-40	50	80	100	120	150	170	190	220	240	360	480	720	970	1210
-50	60	90	120	150	180	210	240	270	300	450	590	890	1190	1500
To use the table, find the reported temperature in the left column, and read across the top row to locate the height above the airport (subtract the airport elevation from the flight altitude). Find the intersection of the temperature row and height above airport column. This number represents how far the aircraft may be below the indicated altitude due to possible cold temperature induced error.

Some approved flight management systems are capable of automatically apply the temperature correction, in which case the temperature correction does not need to be reapplied.

For vertical separation purposes, pilots are required to inform air traffic controllers on the temperature correction applied except for the final approach segment and are never allowed to change the altimeter setting for altitude correction.

== Incidents ==
On February 9, 2020, while on an approach to Usinsk Airport, a Boeing 737-500 operated by Utair flew below its glidepath and struck a pile of snow located 32 m (105 ft) before the runway. Russia's Interstate Aviation Committee determined that the crew member failed to correct for the cold air temperature, which was measured to be −21 °C (−6 °F) at the time of the crash, resulting in the aircraft flying at 280 ft (85 m) below its indicated altitude.
