= Instrument approach =

Aircraft landing procedure

An "approach plate" depicting an instrument approach procedure for an ILS approach to Tacoma Narrows Airport in the United States

In aviation, an instrument approach or instrument approach procedure (IAP) is a series of predetermined maneuvers for the orderly transfer of an aircraft operating under instrument flight rules from the beginning of the initial approach to a landing, or to a point from which a landing may be made visually. These approaches are approved in the European Union by EASA and the respective country authorities, and in the United States by the FAA or the United States Department of Defense for the military. The ICAO defines an instrument approach as "a series of predetermined maneuvers by reference to flight instruments with specific protection from obstacles from the initial approach fix, or where applicable, from the beginning of a defined arrival route to a point from which a landing can be completed and thereafter, if landing is not completed, to a position at which holding or en route obstacle clearance criteria apply."

There are three categories of instrument approach procedures: precision approach (PA), approach with vertical guidance (APV), and non-precision approach (NPA). A precision approach uses a navigation system that provides course and glidepath guidance. Examples include precision approach radar (PAR), instrument landing system (ILS), and GBAS landing system (GLS). An approach with vertical guidance also uses a navigation system for course and glidepath deviation, just not to the same standards as a PA. Examples include baro-VNAV, localizer type directional aid (LDA) with glidepath, LNAV/VNAV and LPV. A non-precision approach uses a navigation system for course deviation but does not provide glidepath information. These approaches include VOR, NDB, LP (Localizer Performance), and LNAV. PAs and APVs are flown to a decision height/altitude (DH/DA), while non-precision approaches are flown to a minimum descent altitude (MDA).

IAP charts are aeronautical charts that portray the aeronautical data that is required to execute an instrument approach to an airport. Besides depicting topographic features, hazards and obstructions, they depict the procedures and airport diagram. Each procedure chart uses a specific type of electronic navigation system such as an NDB, TACAN, VOR, ILS/MLS and RNAV. The chart name reflects the primary navigational aid (NAVAID), if there is more than one straight-in procedure or if it is just a circling-only procedure. A communication strip on the chart lists frequencies in the order they are used. Minimum, maximum and mandatory altitudes are depicted in addition to the minimum safe altitude (MSA) for emergencies. A cross depicts the final approach fix (FAF) altitude on NPAs while a lightning bolt does the same for PAs. NPAs depict the MDA while a PA shows both the decision altitude (DA) and decision height (DH). Finally, the chart depicts the missed approach procedures in plan and profile view, besides listing the steps in sequence.

Before satellite navigation (GNSS) was available for civilian aviation, the requirement for large land-based navigation aid (NAVAID) facilities generally limited the use of instrument approaches to land-based (i.e. asphalt, gravel, turf, ice) runways (and those on aircraft carriers). GNSS technology allows, at least theoretically, to create instrument approaches to any point on the Earth's surface (whether on land or water); consequently, there are nowadays examples of water aerodromes (such as Rangeley Lake Seaplane Base in Maine, United States) that have GNSS-based approaches.

== Instrument approach segments ==
An instrument approach procedure may contain up to five separate segments, which depict course, distance, and minimum altitude. These segments are

- Feeder routes: A route for aircraft to proceed from the en route structure to the IAF, which includes the course and bearing to be flown, the distance, and the minimum altitude.
- Initial approach segment: This segment provides a method for aligning the aircraft with the intermediate or final approach segment and to permit descent during the alignment. It begins at an IAF and ends at the intermediate approach segment or intermediate fix (IF). A DME arc, a procedure turn / teardrop turn, or holding pattern may be involved or the terminal route may simply intersect the final approach course.
- Intermediate approach segment: This segment positions the aircraft for the final descent to the airport. It begins at the IF and ends at the final approach segment.
- Final approach segment: For a PA or APV, this segment starts where the glideslope intercepts the glideslope-intercept altitude plane. For an NPA, this segment starts at the FAF, final approach point (FAP), or where the aircraft is established on the final approach course. This segment ends at either the designated missed approach point (MAP) or upon landing.
- Missed approach segment: This segment starts at the MAP and ends at a point or fix where the initial or en route segment begins.

When an aircraft is under radar control, air traffic control (ATC) may replace some or all of these phases of the approach with radar vectors (ICAO radar vectoring is the provision of navigational guidance to aircraft in the form of specific headings, based on the use of radar). ATC will use an imaginary "approach gate" when vectoring aircraft to the final approach course. This gate will be 1 nautical mile (NM) from the FAF and at least 5 NM from the landing threshold. Outside radar environments, the instrument approach starts at the IAF.

== Types of approaches ==
Though ground-based NAVAID approaches still exist, the FAA is transitioning to approaches which are satellite-based (RNAV). Additionally, in lieu of the published approach procedure, a flight may continue as an IFR flight to landing while increasing the efficiency of the arrival with either a contact or visual approach.

=== Visual approach ===
A visual approach is an ATC authorization for an aircraft on an IFR flight plan to proceed visually to the airport of intended landing; it is not an instrument approach procedure.

A visual approach may be requested by the pilot or offered by ATC. Visual approaches are possible when weather conditions permit continuous visual contact with the destination airport. They are issued in such weather conditions in order to expedite handling of IFR traffic. The ceiling must be reported or expected to be at least 1000 feet AGL (above ground level) and the visibility is at least 3 SM (statute miles).

A pilot may accept a visual approach clearance as soon as the pilot has the destination airport in sight. According to ICAO Doc. 4444, it is enough for a pilot to see the terrain to accept a visual approach. The point is that if a pilot is familiar with the terrain in the vicinity of the airfield he/she may easily find the way to the airport having the surface in sight. ATC must ensure that weather conditions at the airport are above certain minima (in the U.S., a ceiling of 1000 feet AGL or greater and visibility of at least 3 statute miles) before issuing the clearance. According to ICAO Doc. 4444, it is enough if the pilot reports that in his/her opinion the weather conditions allow a visual approach to be made. In general, the ATC gives the information about the weather but it's the pilot who makes a decision if the weather is suitable for landing. Once the pilot has accepted the clearance, he/she assumes responsibility for separation and wake turbulence avoidance and may navigate as necessary to complete the approach visually. According to ICAO Doc. 4444, ATC continues to provide separation between the aircraft making a visual approach and other arriving and departing aircraft. The pilot may get responsible for the separation with preceding aircraft in case he/she has the preceding aircraft in sight and is instructed so by ATC. In the United States, it is required that an aircraft have the airport, the runway, or the preceding aircraft in sight. It is not enough to have the terrain in sight (see § Contact approach).

When a pilot accepts a visual approach, the pilot accepts responsibility for establishing a safe landing interval behind the preceding aircraft, as well as responsibility for wake-turbulence avoidance, and to remain clear of clouds.

=== Contact approach ===
A contact approach that may be asked for by the pilot (but not offered by ATC) in which the pilot has 1 SM flight visibility and is clear of clouds and is expected to be able to maintain those conditions all the way to the airport. Obstruction clearances and VFR traffic avoidance become the pilot's responsibility.

=== Charted visual flight procedures (CVFP) ===
A visual approach that has a specified route the aircraft is to follow to the airport. Pilots must have a charted visual landmark or a preceding aircraft in sight, and weather must be at or above the published minimums. Pilots are responsible for maintaining a safe approach interval and wake turbulence separation.

=== RNP approach (formerly RNAV approach) ===
These approaches include both ground-based and satellite-based systems and include criteria for terminal arrival areas (TAAs), basic approach criteria, and final approach criteria. The TAA is a transition from the en route structure to the terminal environment which provides minimum altitudes for obstacle clearance. The TAA is a "T" or "basic T" design with left and right base leg IAFs on initial approach segments perpendicular to the intermediate approach segment where there is a dual purpose IF/IAF for a straight-in procedure (no procedure turn [NoPT]), or hold-in-lieu-of procedure-turn (HILPT) course reversal. The base leg IAFs is 3 to 6 NM from the IF/IAF. The basic-T is aligned with the runway centerline, with the IF 5 NM from the FAF, and the FAF is 5 NM from the threshold.

The RNP approach chart should have four lines of approach minimums corresponding to LPV, LNAV/VNAV, LNAV, and circling. This allows GPS or WAAS equipped aircraft to use the LNAV MDA using GPS only, if WAAS becomes unavailable.

=== ILS approach ===
These are the most precise and accurate approaches. A runway with an ILS can accommodate 29 arrivals per hour.

ILS systems on two or three runways increase capacity with parallel (dependent) ILS, simultaneous parallel (independent) ILS, precision runway monitor (PRM), and converging ILS approaches. ILS approaches have three classifications, CAT I, CAT II, and CAT III. CAT I SA, CAT II and CAT III require additional certification for operators, pilots, aircraft and equipment, with CAT III used mainly by air carriers and the military. Simultaneous parallel approaches require runway centerlines to be between 4,300 and 9,000 feet apart, plus a "dedicated final monitor controller" to monitor aircraft separation. Simultaneous close parallel (independent) PRM approaches must have runways separation to be between 3,400 and 4,300 feet. Simultaneous offset instrument approaches (SOIAs) apply to runways separated by 750–3,000 feet. A SOIA uses an ILS/PRM on one runway and an LDA/PRM with glideslope for the other.

=== VOR approach ===
These approaches use VOR facilities on and off the airport and may be supplemented with DME and TACAN.

=== NDB approach ===
These approaches use NDB facilities on and off the airport and may be supplemented with a DME. These approaches are gradually being phased out in Western countries.

=== Radar approach ===
This will be either a precision approach radar (PAR) or an airport surveillance radar (ASR) approach. Information is published in tabular form. The PAR provides vertical and lateral guidance plus range. The ASR only provides heading and range information.

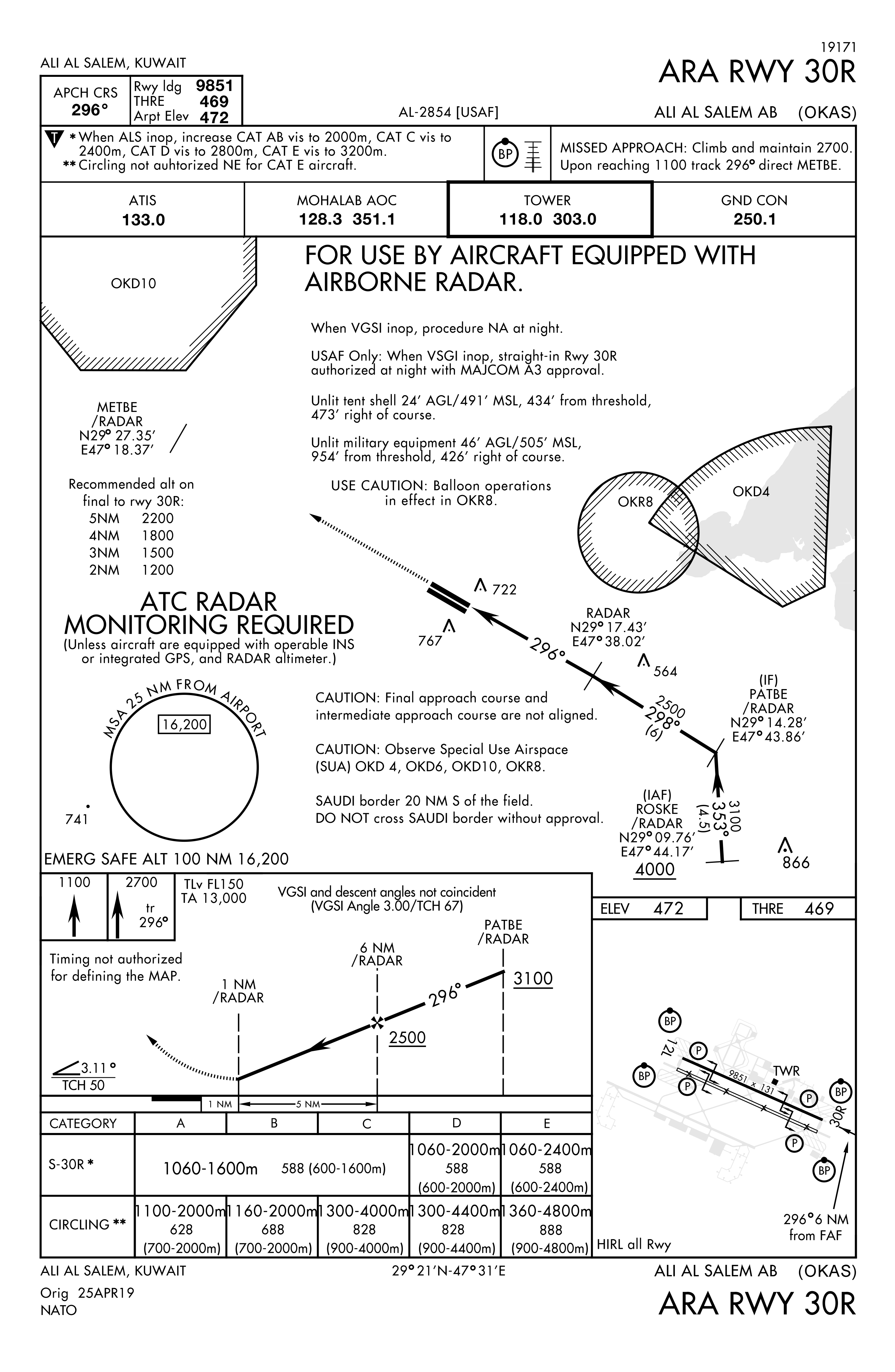
Chart depicting airborne radar approach at Ali Al Salem Air Base, Kuwait

=== Airborne radar approach ===
This is a rare type of approach, where a radar installed on the approaching aircraft is used as the primary means of navigation for the approach. It is mainly used at offshore oil platforms and select military bases. This type of approach takes advantage of the runway or more commonly, the oil platform, standing out from its surrounding environment when viewed on a radar. For additional visibility on a radar, radar reflectors may be installed alongside the runway.

=== Localizer approach ===
These approaches include a localizer approach, localizer/DME approach, localizer back course approach, and a localizer-type directional aid (LDA). In cases where an ILS is installed, a back course may be available in conjunction with the localizer. Reverse sensing occurs on the back course using standard VOR equipment. With a horizontal situation indicator (HSI) system, reverse sensing is eliminated if it is set appropriately to the front course.

=== Simplified directional facility (SDF) approach ===
This type of approach is similar to the ILS localizer approach, but with less precise guidance.

== Non-precision approaches and systems ==
An example of a VOR-A approach into Baker City Municipal Airport

Non-precision systems provide lateral guidance (that is, heading information), but do not provide vertical guidance (i.e., altitude or glide path guidance).

- VHF omnidirectional range (VOR)
- Tactical air navigation (TACAN)
- Non-directional beacon (NDB) – ground-based transmitter for aircraft equipped with an Automatic Direction Finder (ADF).
- Simplified directional facility (SDF)
- Satellite navigation systems, such as the American Global Positioning System (GPS). LNAV and LNAV/VNAV approaches require Receiver autonomous integrity monitoring (RAIM) which detects problems with GPS satellites. LPV (Localiser Performance with Vertical guidance) and LP (without vertical guidance) do not require RAIM since they utilise SBAS correcting signal like Wide Area Augmentation System (WAAS) or European Geostationary Navigation Overlay Service (EGNOS).
- Required navigation performance (RNP) – a system that utilizes on-board performance monitoring through the aircraft's flight management system
- Localizer (LOC)
- Localizer type directional aid (LDA)
- Surveillance radar approach (SRA) – also known in some countries as an ASR approach
- Airport surveillance radar (ASR) – military designation for SRA
- VDF approach – these days rare, but based on the air traffic controller determining the direction of arrival of an airplane's VHF radio transmission, and guiding the pilot based on this information. Can also exist in a charted form wherein controller-guided VDF navigation is combined with dead-reckoning by the pilot.

== Precision approaches and systems ==
Precision approach systems provide both lateral (heading) and vertical (glidepath) guidance.

- Ground controlled approach (GCA)
- GBAS landing system (GLS)
- Instrument landing system (ILS)
- Joint Precision Approach and Landing System (JPALS)
- Microwave landing system (MLS)
- Precision approach radar (PAR)
- Transponder landing system (TLS)

== Basic concepts ==
=== Decision height or altitude ===
Illustration of DA and DH

In a precision approach, the decision height (DH) or decision altitude (DA) is a specified lowest height or altitude in the approach descent at which, if the required visual reference to continue the approach (such as the runway markings or runway environment) is not visible to the pilot, the pilot must initiate a missed approach. (A decision height is measured AGL (above ground level) while a decision altitude is measured above MSL (mean sea level).) The specific values for DH and/or DA at a given airport are established with intention to allow a pilot sufficient time to safely re-configure an aircraft to climb and execute the missed approach procedures while avoiding terrain and obstacles. While a DH/DA denotes the altitude at which a missed approach procedure must be started, it does not preclude the aircraft from descending below the prescribed DH/DA.

In CAT III ILS landings, the decision height may be zero (“no decision height”). In that case, a landing is possible without visual reference.

=== Minimum descent altitude (MDA) ===
Illustration of minimum descent altitude during a non-precision approach

In a non-precision approach (that is when no electronic glideslope is provided), the minimum descent altitude (MDA) is the lowest altitude, expressed in feet above mean sea level, to which descent is authorized on final approach or during circle-to-land maneuvering in execution of a standard instrument approach procedure. The pilot may descend to the MDA, and may maintain it, but must not descend below it until visual reference is obtained, and must initiate a missed approach if visual reference has not been obtained upon reaching the missed approach point (MAP).

DH/DA, the corresponding parameter for precision approach, differs from MDA in that the missed approach procedure must be initiated immediately on reaching DH/DA, if visual reference has not yet been obtained: but some overshoot below it is permitted while doing so because of the vertical momentum involved in following a precision approach glide-path. By contrast, when flying an approach with an MDA, if a missed approach is required, it must be executed without descending below the MDA; the pilot must begin to level off or fly the missed approach before reaching the MDA.

If a runway has both non-precision and precision approaches defined, the MDA of the non-precision approach is almost always greater than the DH/DA of the precision approach, because of the lack of vertical guidance on the non-precision approach. The extra height depends on the accuracy of the navaid the approach is based on, with ADF approaches and SRAs tending to have the highest MDAs.

All published minimums assume full operation of all components and visual aids. When any component is malfunctioned, the minimums increase. If more than one component is inoperative, the minimums are raised to the highest minimum required by any single inoperative component.

=== Straight-in approach IFR ===
An instrument approach wherein final approach is begun without first having executed a procedure turn, not necessarily completed with a straight-in landing or made to straight-in landing minimums. A direct instrument approach requires no procedure turn or any other course reversal procedures for alignment (usually indicated by "NoPT" on approach plates), as the arrival direction and the final approach course are not too different from each other. The direct approach can be finished with a straight-in landing or circle-to-land procedure.

=== Course reversal procedure ===
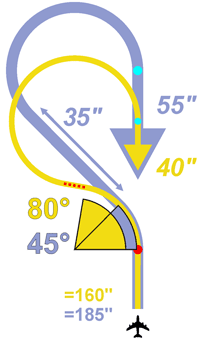
A "procedure turn" maneuver, showing two commonly used variations in the way it may be performed by a pilot.

Some approach procedures do not permit straight-in approaches unless the pilots are being radar vectored. In these situations, pilots are required to complete a procedure turn (PT) or other course reversal, generally within 10 NM of the PT fix, to establish the aircraft inbound on the intermediate or final approach segment. When conducting any type of approach, if the aircraft is not lined up for a straight-in approach, then a course reversal might be necessary. The idea of a course reversal is to allow sufficiently large changes in the course flown (in order to line the aircraft up with the final approach course), without taking too much space horizontally and while remaining within the confines of protected airspace. This is accomplished in one of three ways: a procedure turn, a holding pattern, or a teardrop course reversal.

Procedure turn (PT)
ICAO defines a PT as a maneuver in which a turn is made away from a designated track followed by a turn in the opposite direction to permit the aircraft to intercept and proceed along the reciprocal of the designated track. A standardized way of reversing course to get lined up for final approach. The approach chart must indicate that a procedure turn is authorized for the approach, via a "procedure turn barb" symbol or a similar notation. Note that when a procedure turn exists for an approach, the maximum speed of the aircraft in the procedure turn is limited by regulations (typically, it should not exceed 200 knots IAS). The procedure turn is typically entered by tracking a navaid course outbound (usually following a reciprocal of the inbound course), and then turning 45° off of the course; after that, the pilot flies this leg for a certain time, then conducts a 180° turn to get on a 45° intercepting course, and then re-intercepts the inbound course.
Hold in lieu of procedure turn
It is established over a final or intermediate fix when an approach can be made from a properly aligned holding pattern. It is a required maneuver, as is a PT, unless the aircraft is being radar vectored to the final approach course, when 'NoPT' is shown on the approach chart, or when the pilot requests or the controller advises the pilot to make a 'straight-in' approach. This maneuver is commonly referred to as the racetrack pattern. It is another method of course reversal, but it can also be used for losing altitude within protected airspace. A holding pattern used for this purpose is depicted in U.S. government publications as the "hold-in-lieu-of-PT" holding pattern symbol. The procedure has two parallel legs, with 180° turns between them.

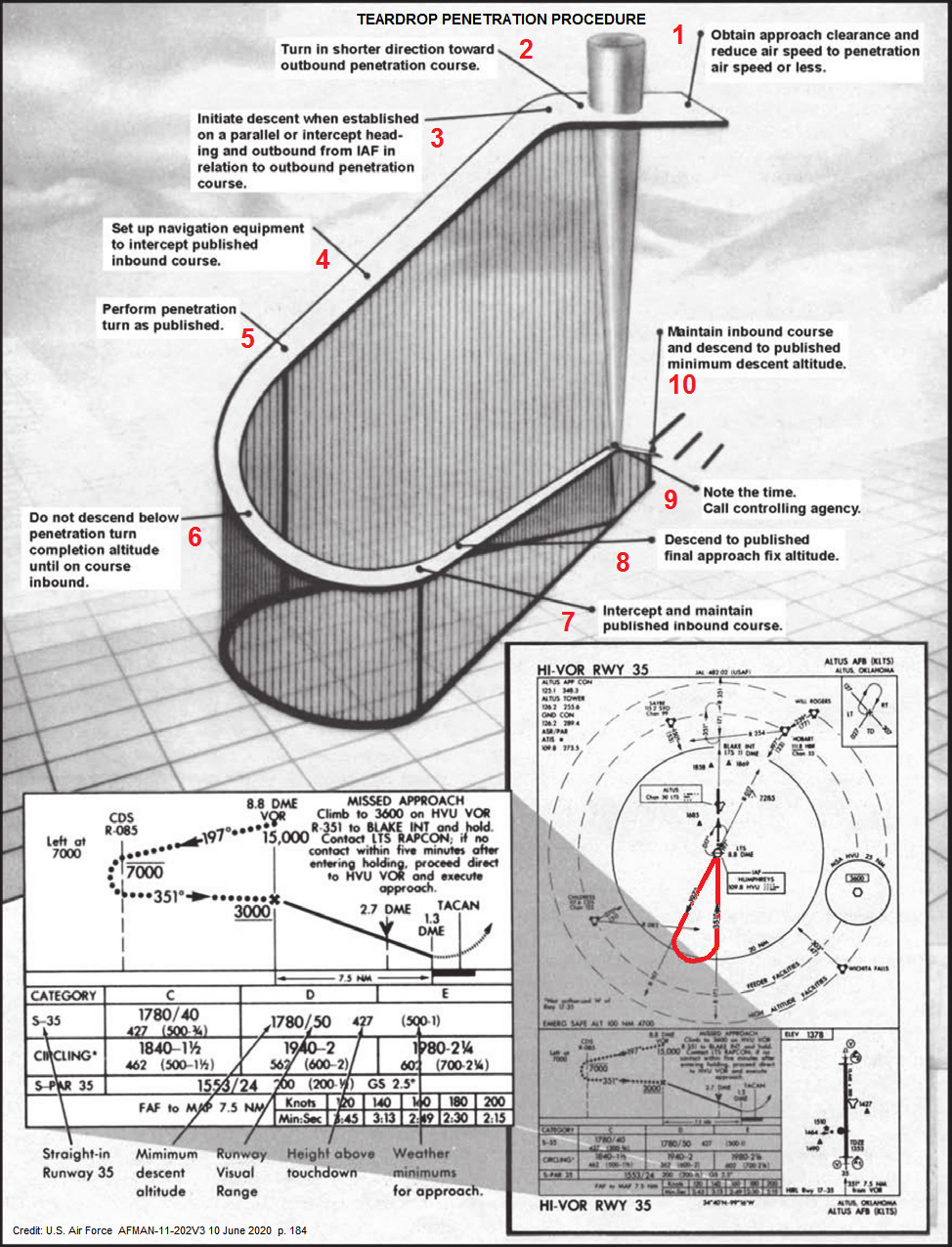
A teardrop penetration diagram, showing a teardrop turn combined with a simultaneous descent

Teardrop procedure or penetration turn
The teardrop procedure consists of departure from an initial approach fix on an outbound course followed by a turn toward and intercepting the inbound course at or prior to the intermediate fix or point. If the controlled airspace is extremely limited, a teardrop may be used to reverse the direction of the aircraft and permit the aircraft to lose altitude. This procedure as viewed on a chart is shaped like an idealized teardrop, hence the name. It typically consists of the outbound course flown at 30° angle to the reciprocal of the inbound course, and then making a 210° turn to intercept the inbound course.

=== Circle-to-land maneuver ===
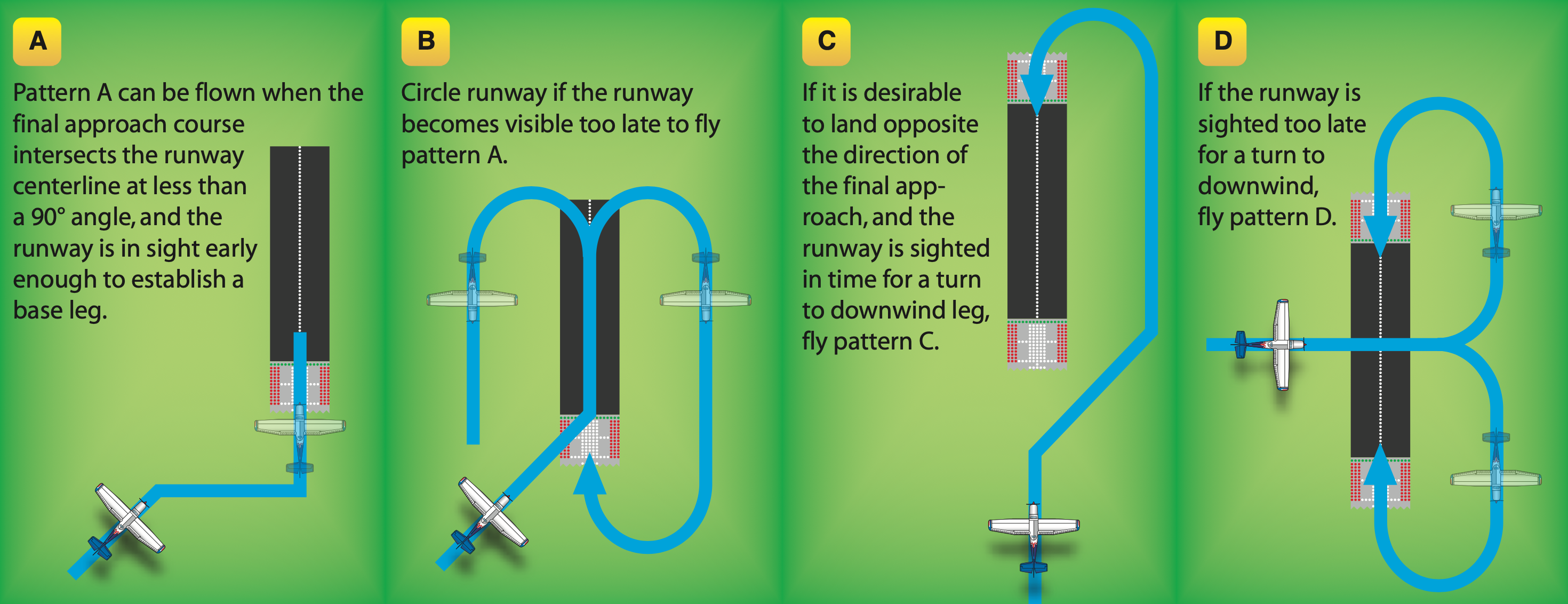
Circling approaches

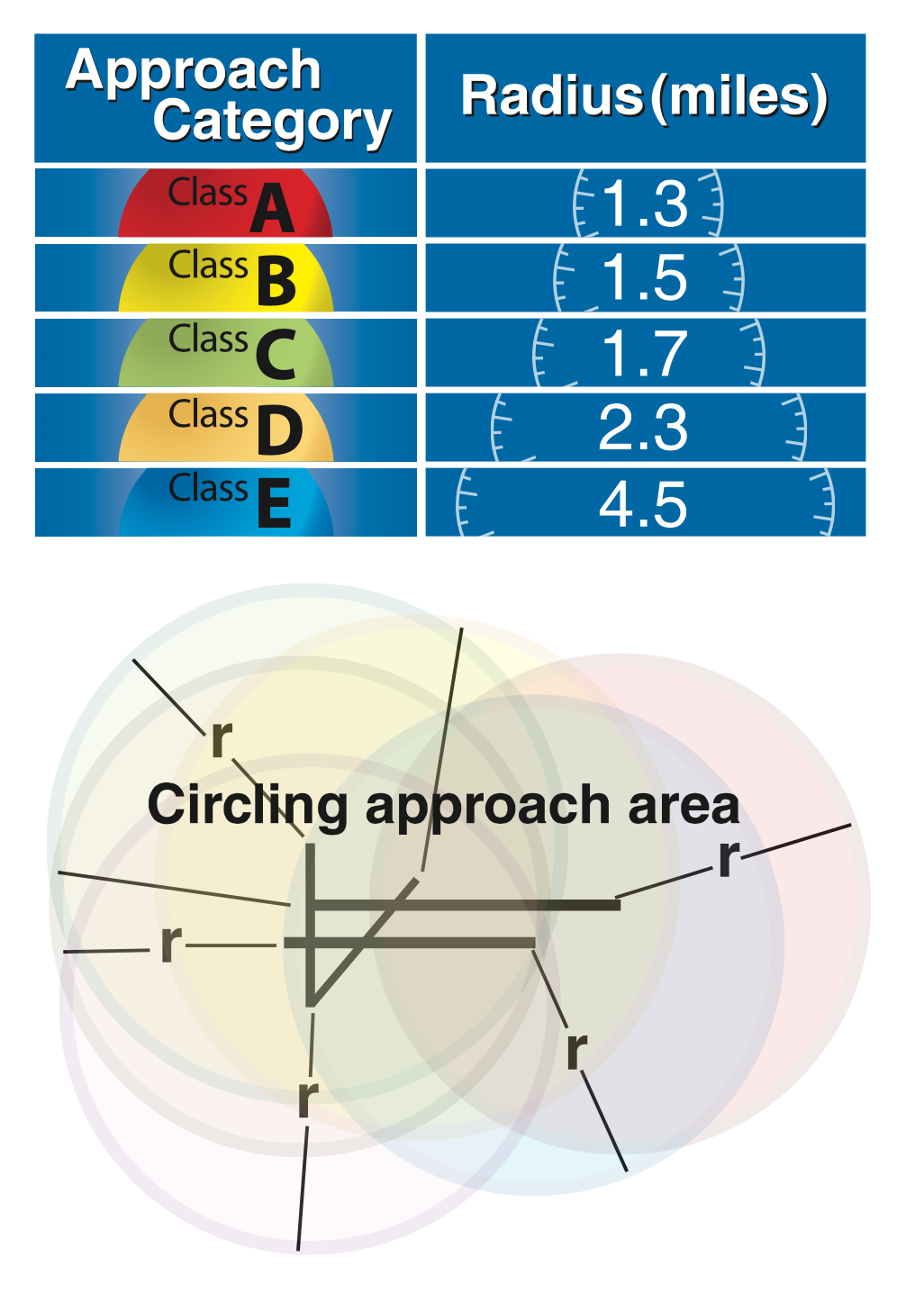
How circling approach area is determined by the aircraft approach category in the United States

Circle-to-land is a maneuver initiated by the pilot to align the aircraft with a runway for landing when a straight-in landing from an instrument approach is not possible or is not desirable, and only after ATC authorization has been obtained and the pilot has established and maintains required visual reference to the airport. A circle-to-land maneuver is an alternative to a straight-in landing. It is a maneuver used when a runway is not aligned within 30 degrees of the final approach course of the instrument approach procedure or the final approach requires 400 feet (or more) of descent per nautical mile, and therefore requires some visual maneuvering of the aircraft in the vicinity of the airport after the instrument portion of the approach is completed to align the aircraft with the runway for landing.

It is very common for a circle-to-land maneuver to be executed during a straight-in approach to a different runway, e.g., an ILS approach to one runway, followed by a low-altitude transition, ending in a landing on another (not necessarily parallel) runway. This way, approach procedures to one runway can be used to land on any runway at the airport, as the other runways might lack instrument procedures or their approaches cannot be used for other reasons (traffic considerations, navigation aids being out of service, etc.).

Circling to land is considered more difficult and less safe than a straight-in landing, especially under instrument meteorological conditions because the aircraft is at a low altitude and must remain within a short distance from the airport in order to be assured of obstacle clearance (often within a couple of miles, even for faster aircraft). The pilot must maintain visual contact with the airport at all times; loss of visual contact requires execution of a missed approach procedure. If the ceiling allows, pilots are recommended to fly closer to the airport's pattern altitude for a safer operation.

Pilots should be aware that there are significant differences in obstacle clearance criteria between procedures designed in accordance with ICAO PANS-OPS and US TERPS. This is especially true in respect of circling approaches where the assumed radius of turn and minimum obstacle clearance are markedly different. In the United States, the published circling minimums guarantees a minimum of 300 ft (91 m) above any obstacles within the circling area, which is defined by a radius from runways based on the aircraft's approach category.

=== Sidestep maneuver ===
A visual maneuver by a pilot performed at the completion of an instrument approach to permit a straight-in landing on a parallel runway not more than 1,200 feet to either side of the runway to which the instrument approach was conducted.

=== Rate-of-descent formula ===
A useful formula pilots use to calculate descent rates (for the standard 3° glide slope):

Rate of descent = (ground speed / 2) × 10

or

Rate of descent = ground speed × 5

For other glideslope angles:

Rate of descent = glide slope angle × ground speed × 100 / 60,

where rate of descent is in feet per minute, and ground speed is in knots.

The latter replaces tan α (see below) with α/60, which has an error of about 5% up to 10°.

Example:

  120 kn × 5
  or
  120 kn / 2 × 10
= 600 ft/min

The simplified formulas above are based on a trigonometric calculation:

Rate of descent = ground speed × 101.27 × tan α

where:

- α is the descent or glideslope angle from the horizontal (3° being the standard)
- 101.27 (^{ft/min}/_{kn}) is the conversion factor from knots to feet per minute (1 knot = 1 ^{NM}/_{h} ≈ 6076 ^{ft}/_{h} ≈ 101.27 ft/min)

Example:

Ground speed = 120 kn
           α = 3°
  120 kn × 101.27ft/min/kn × tan 3°
≈ 640 ft/min

== Airport requirements ==
Special considerations for low visibility operations include improved lighting for the approach area, runways, and taxiways, and the location of emergency equipment. There must be redundant electrical systems so that in the event of a power failure, the back-up takes over operation of the required airport instrumentation (e.g., the ILS and lighting). ILS critical areas must be free from other aircraft and vehicles to avoid multipathing.

In the United States, the requirements and the standards for establishing instrument approaches at an airport are contained in the FAA Order 8260.3 "United States Standard for Terminal Instrument Procedures (TERPS)". ICAO publishes requirements in the ICAO Doc 8168 "Procedures for Air Navigation Services – Aircraft Operations (PANS-OPS), Volume II: Construction of Visual and Instrument Flight Procedures".

Mountain airports such as Reno–Tahoe International Airport (KRNO) offer significantly different instrument approaches for aircraft landing on the same runway, but from opposite directions. Aircraft approaching from the north must make visual contact with the airport at a higher altitude than a flight approaching from the south, because of rapidly rising terrain south of the airport. This higher altitude allows a flight crew to clear the obstacle if a landing is not feasible. In general, each specific instrument approach specifies the minimum weather conditions that must be present in order for the landing to be made.

Cold temperature airports in colder climates and high altitudes are subject to barometric altimeter errors and require cold temperature error corrections.

== See also ==
- Index of aviation articles
- Marker beacon
- Final approach

== Audio and multimedia resources ==
- Audio and commentary of a full-procedure RNAV (GPS) approach into Flint Bishop International Airport (KFNT)
- Audio of a US instrument rating checkride – Part 1 (including RNAV 18 at KFNT)
- Audio of a US instrument rating checkride – Part 2 (including VOR 9 at KFNT partial panel and the ILS 9R at KPTK)
