= Vertical navigation =

Information provided during an instrument approach

In aviation, vertical navigation (VNAV, usually pronounced vee-nav) is glidepath information provided during an instrument approach, independently of ground-based navigation aids in the context of an approach and a form of vertical guidance in the context of climb/descent. An onboard navigation system displays a constant rate descent path to minimums. The VNAV path is computed using aircraft performance, approach constraints, weather data, and aircraft weight. The approach path is computed from the top of descent point to the end of descent waypoint, which is typically the runway or missed approach point.

== Overview ==
A flight management system (FMS) uses either a performance-based or a geometric VNAV system. A performance-based VNAV system computes a descent path from the top of the descent to the first constrained waypoint using idle or near idle power. This is referred to as an idle descent path at ECON (most economic, or most fuel-efficient) speed. This is very fuel efficient and therefore saves money and is great for budget-constrained airlines. Therefore, most large airliners feature a performance-based VNAV system, often connected to an autothrottle to automatically select idle thrust or increase thrust to maintain a set speed when an idle descent is not possible. This form of VNAV connected to an autothrottle is referred to as coupled VNAV. A geometric VNAV system, rather than calculating a path based on efficiency, calculates a path between waypoints either by selecting points to start descent to the next waypoint based on a predefined angle or descent rate - often 3 degrees or 1000 feet per minute - or by calculating the required angle between altitude or speed-constrained waypoints to keep a continuous descent. Geometric VNAV systems are most often found on general and business aircraft equipped with a flight management system and therefore, as most of these aircraft do not have an autothrottle, are not coupled.

A special example of a VNAV system is that found on the Bombardier CRJ family, which calculates a geometric VNAV path but does not have an autopilot mode for following it (except CRJ1000 and select CRJ700/CRJ900 aircraft), nor a vertical path indicator on the PFD or ND. Instead, it uses an "advisory VNAV" system where the VNAV path is flown in V/S mode by selecting an amount of vertical speed that the aircraft indicates on the vertical speed indicator. Speed constraints must be manually taken into account as the aircraft does not have an autothrottle.

RNAV approaches combine VNAV navigation equipment with LNAV navigation equipment to provide both lateral and vertical approach guidance. Vertical guidance comes from WAAS GPS or a barometric VNAV (Baro-VNAV) system. The FMS provides flight control steering and thrust guidance along the VNAV path.

VNAV information on an approach plate includes the Final Approach Fix (FAF), the FAF crossing altitude, a Vertical Descent Angle (VDA), the landing runway threshold as a second fix, the Threshold Crossing Height (TCH), and perhaps a Visual Descent Point (VDP). A pilot uses the VDA, and ground speed, to compute a rate of descent (from a table found in the U.S. Terminal Procedures Publication), which is flown using the Vertical velocity indicator.

Aircraft approved for LNAV/VNAV minimums include the Boeing 737NG, 767, 777, the Airbus A300 and some ATRs.

== Autopilot ==
VNAV is also the name of autopilot vertical modes in several aircraft. Some aircraft have two VNAV modes, VNAV Speed and VNAV Path (or Open Climb/Descent and Managed Climb/Descent in Airbus aircraft, respectively). In VNAV Speed mode, the autopilot adjusts the aircraft's pitch to achieve and maintain a selected speed (similar to flight level change/speed mode). In coupled VNAV systems, the autothrottle will automatically select climb power for climb and flight idle for descent. In VNAV Path mode, the aircraft adjusts the pitch to achieve and maintain the desired vertical profile. In coupled VNAV systems, the autothrottle will select flight idle for descent but can add thrust if the aircraft is dropping below the selected speed. In many aircraft equipped with spoilers, the FMS may also display a "drag required" or "more drag" message to indicate to the pilots that the aircraft is unable to stay on the VNAV path and maintain the selected speed, telling the pilots they need to use the spoilers to add drag and decelerate the aircraft.

In modern aircraft, the aircraft will often stay in VNAV mode for almost the entire flight. The aircraft will typically climb in VNAV Speed and descend in VNAV Path.

In some Boeing aircraft, there is a single VNAV selector button, and the autopilot will switch between VNAV Speed and VNAV Path automatically. This is known as common VNAV.

== See also ==
- Index of aviation articles
