= ARINC 424 =

International standard file format for aircraft navigation data

ARINC 424 or ARINC 424 Navigation System Data Base Standard is an international standard file format for aircraft navigation data maintained by Airlines Electronic Engineering Committee and published by Aeronautical Radio, Inc. The ARINC 424 specifications are not a database, but a "standard for the preparation and transmission of data for assembly of airborne navigation system data bases".

ARINC 424 specifies a 132-byte fixed-length record format. Each record consists of one piece of navigation information such as an airport, heliport, runway, waypoints, navaids, airways, arrival routes, and departure routes.

Since its initial publication in May 1975 ARINC 424 has been amended many times, introducing new record types and field values and revised coding rules as required by new technologies and classes of equipment such as GPS and Flight Management Computers. Each amendment is issued as a supplement, a format number suffix indicating the revision level of the standard. Supplement 22 was issued in July 2018, but the FAA currently publishes data in the older ARINC 424-18 format.
