= Standard terminal arrival route =

Set of arrival waypoints used in aviation

"DEMME 5" arrival route for Pittsburgh International Airport, United States

In aviation, a standard terminal arrival route (STAR) is a published flight procedure followed by aircraft on an instrument flight rules (IFR) flight plan just before reaching a destination airport.

A STAR is an air traffic control (ATC)-coded IFR arrival route established for application to arriving IFR aircraft destined for certain airports. Area navigation (RNAV) STAR/FMSP procedures for arrivals serve the same purpose but are used only by aircraft equipped with flight management systems (FMS) or GPS. The purpose of both is to simplify clearance delivery procedures and facilitate transition between en route and instrument approach procedures.

== Description ==
A STAR is a flight route defined and published by the air navigation service provider that usually covers the phase of a flight that lies between the last point of the route filed in the flight plan and the first point of the approach to the airport, normally the initial approach fix (IAF). Hence, a STAR connects the en-route phase with the approach phase of the flight.

A typical STAR consists of a set of starting points, called transitions, and a description of routes (typically via VHF omnidirectional range (VOR) radio beacons and airway intersections) from each of these transitions to a point near the destination airport, from where the aircraft can undertake an instrument approach (IAP) or be vectored for a final approach by terminal air traffic control. Not all airports have published STARs, but most relatively large or hard to reach (e.g., in a mountainous area) airports do. Sometimes several airports in a locality share a single STAR; in such circumstances, aircraft follow the same arrival route until the final waypoint, diverging thereafter for their chosen destination.

Although the route segment of the filed flight plan does not usually change during the flight itself, the STAR to be flown might well vary according to the weather, the runway or approach in use, or the need to safely separate air traffic, among other factors. Thus, a filed flight plan typically ends some distance from touchdown, where a STAR begins, and the actual STAR to use is usually assigned and communicated to the pilot while the flight is already underway.

Naming conventions for STARs vary by country and region. In Europe, they are often named after the transition waypoint, followed by a digit that is incremented with each revision of the procedure, and a letter designating the runway for which the STAR is intended. In the United States, STARs are named after waypoints, or unique features of the STAR, or geographical features, followed by a digit indicating the STAR revision. A single STAR in the United States may serve multiple runways and transitions; European STARs are more likely to be independently published for each runway and/or transition.

Not all STARs are for IFR flights. Occasionally, STARs are published for visual approaches, in which case they refer to landmarks visible on the ground or other visual reference points, instead of waypoints or radio navigation aids.

STARs can be very detailed (as is often the case in Europe), allowing pilots to go from descent to approach entirely on their own once ATC has cleared them for the arrival, or they can be more general (as is often the case in the United States), providing guidance to the pilot, which is then supplemented by instructions from ATC. Typically, European STARs are very runway-specific and allow approaches to be made without the controller needing to issue radar vectors frequently until short final. STARs published and used for United States air traffic tend not to have many deviations in waypoints per-runway, though they do have some.

== See also ==
- Standard instrument departure
