= Missed approach point =

Emergency aircraft procedure

MAPt during a non-precision approach

Missed approach point (MAP or MAPt) is the point prescribed in each instrument approach at which a missed approach procedure shall be executed if the required visual reference does not exist. It defines the point for both precision and non-precision approaches wherein the missed approach segment of an approach procedure begins. A pilot must execute a missed approach if a required visual reference (normally the runway or its environment) is not in sight upon reaching the MAP or the pilot decides it is unsafe to continue with the approach and landing to the runway. The missed approach point is published in the approach plates and contains instructions for missed approach procedures to be executed at this point.

Definition of MAP depends on whether the approach flown is a precision or a non-precision one:

- Non-precision approach. The MAP for a non-precision approach is typically crossed at the minimum descent altitude (MDA), and may be anywhere from well before the runway threshold to past the opposite end of the runway, depending on terrain, obstructions, NAVAID location and air traffic considerations.
- Precision approach. The MAP on a precision approach is reached when the aircraft reaches the decision height prescribed for the approach while maintaining the glideslope.

In both cases, the pilot in command must make a clear and unequivocal Yes/No decision upon arrival at the MAP – either the runway (or its specified environment) is positively visible and accessible for landing using a safe and stabilized approach (i.e. no excessively steep bank or descent angles required), in which case the approach to landing may be continued, or else the approach must be discontinued and the published missed approach procedure must be initiated immediately.

== Visual descent point (U.S.) ==
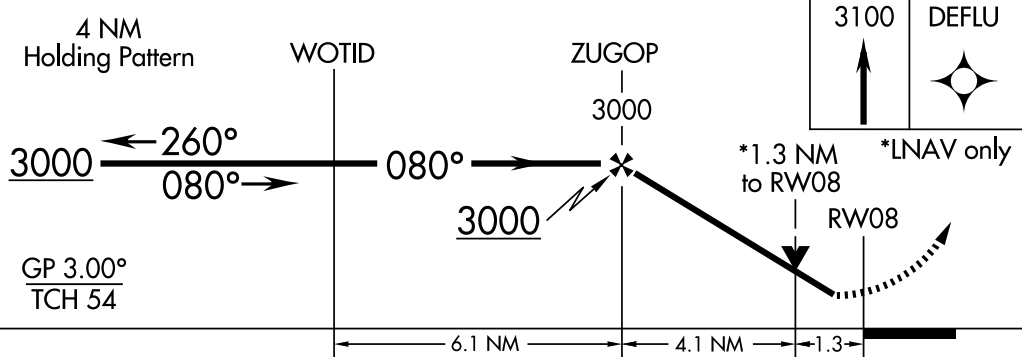
Profile view of an RNAV approach, featuring a "V" symbol for visual descent point, and missed approach point (denoted by dashed lines) shortly after that.

A concept related to the missed approach point is the visual descent point (VDP). Determination of its location is done by the designers of the instrument approach procedure, but typically this is a point on the final approach course of a non-precision approach, from which the aircraft would be able to continue its descent from the MDA to the runway threshold while maintaining a standard 3° descent angle while being assured obstacle clearance. In other words, usually it is the point (on the profile view of the approach) where a line depicting a 3° descent angle would intercept the horizontal line at the MDA. If the pilot does not have the required visual reference to continue the descent from the MDA at this point, he/she must continue to fly at or above the MDA, and the rapidly steepening descent angle required to complete a successful landing on the runway means that a safe and successful approach becomes less likely.

The concept of VDP was developed by the FAA to encourage pilots to decide to initiate a missed approach before reaching the MAP, in a situation where the runway or its environment is not visible at a normal descent angle. Conversely, if the runway is visible at the VDP, the pilot may continue descent, following a standard descent angle to the runway, while being assured terrain and obstacle clearance. The VDP is always located before reaching the MAP, and is a more useful checkpoint for making the decision whether to continue on the approach or to go around than the MAP itself.

The following is the official FAA definition of VDP:

"A defined point on the final approach course of a nonprecision straight-in approach procedure from which normal descent from the MDA to the runway touchdown point may be commenced, provided the approach threshold of that runway, or approach lights, or other markings identifiable with the approach end of that runway are clearly visible to the pilot."

=== Design ===
A VDP will be established for all non-precision approach procedures, with the limitations that:

- A VDP shall not be published when the primary altimeter setting comes from a remote source.
- A VDP shall not be located prior to a stepdown fix.
- A VDP shall not be located between a MAP and the runway.
- A VDP shall not be published when obstacles penetrate the visual area 20:1 surface.
- The VDP is required to be at least 0.5 nautical mile from any other final segment fixes, such as MAPs and step downs fixes, but a distance of at least 1 nautical mile is recommended.

The location of VDP is calculated using the following formula:

$Distance_{VDP} = \frac{r \times \pi}{180} \times (90 - \theta-asin(\frac{cos(\theta) \times (r + THRe + TCH)}{r + MDA}))$ Where:

- $MDA =$ Lowest published MDA
- $THRe =$ Threshold elevation
- $TCH =$ Visual Glide Slope Indicator threshold crossing height if equipped on the runway, or design threshold crossing height
- $\theta =$ Visual Glide Slope Indicator angle or specified Vertical Descent Angle
- $r =$ 20890537, Earth radius for spherical calculations in feet

== See also ==
- Index of aviation articles
- List of aviation mnemonics
- Wave off
