= Aircraft approach category =

Grouping used for air traffic control

An aircraft approach category is a grouping which differentiates aircraft based on the speed at which the aircraft approaches a runway for landing.

They are used to determine airspace, obstacle clearance and visibility requirements for instrument approaches.

== Definition ==
The International Civil Aviation Organization (ICAO) classifies aircraft by their indicated airspeed at runway threshold (V_{at}, also known as approach speed or V_{REF}).

The categories are as follows:

- Category A: less than 169 km/h (91 kn) indicated airspeed (IAS)
- Category B: 169 km/h (91 kn) or more but less than 224 km/h (121 kn) IAS
- Category C: 224 km/h (121 kn) or more but less than 261 km/h (141 kn) IAS
- Category D: 261 km/h (141 kn) or more but less than 307 km/h (166 kn) IAS
- Category E: 307 km/h (166 kn) or more but less than 391 km/h (211 kn) IAS
- Category H: Helicopters

Helicopters may use Category A minima on instrument procedures designed for aeroplanes, or may use specific procedures designed for helicopters.

Threshold speed is calculated as 1.3 times stall speed V_{s0} or 1.23 times stall speed V_{s1g} in the landing configuration at maximum certificated landing mass. Aircraft approach categories do not change during day-to-day operation. To change an aircraft's category, an aircraft must be re-certified with a different maximum landing mass. Pilots may not use a lower category than the one certified, but may choose to use a higher category for higher speed approaches.

The maximum permitted speed for visual manoeuvring is significantly higher than the threshold speed. Additional speed ranges are specified for other segments of the approach.

Approach plates generally include visibility requirements up to category D. While ICAO specify a top speed of 391 km/h for Category E, there exist no aircraft with an approach speed above this.

== United States of America ==
Approach category definitions in the United States of America are similar to those defined by ICAO. They are defined in terms of V_{REF} of a given aircraft, or if V_{REF} is not specified, 1.3 V_{s0} at the maximum certificated landing weight. The values of V_{REF}, V_{S0}, and the maximum certificated landing weight are established for the aircraft by the certification authority of the country of registry. The United States does not give a top speed for Category E.

=== Examples ===
Selected examples from FAA Circular 150/5300-13A - Airport Design:

Aircraft	Code	Approach Speed
Piper PA-28R Cherokee Arrow	A	70 kn (130 km/h)
Douglas DC-3	A	74 kn (137 km/h)
Cessna 210 Centurion	A	75 kn (139 km/h)
Douglas DC-4	B	94 kn (174 km/h)
Douglas DC-6	B	108 kn (200 km/h)
Fokker F27 Friendship	B	120 kn (220 km/h)
Boeing 707-320B	C	128 kn (237 km/h)
McDonnell Douglas DC-9-15	C	132 kn (244 km/h)
Boeing 737-700	C	130 kn (240 km/h)
Boeing 737-800	D	142 kn (263 km/h)
Airbus A350-900	D	145 kn (269 km/h)
Boeing 747-400	D	157 kn (291 km/h)

The Northrop T-38 Talon is an example of an Approach Category E aircraft.

The Space Shuttle had a landing speed of about 346 km/h (187 kn).

== See also ==
- Aircraft category
- Wake turbulence category
