= Instrument flight rules =

Civil aviation regulations for flight on instruments

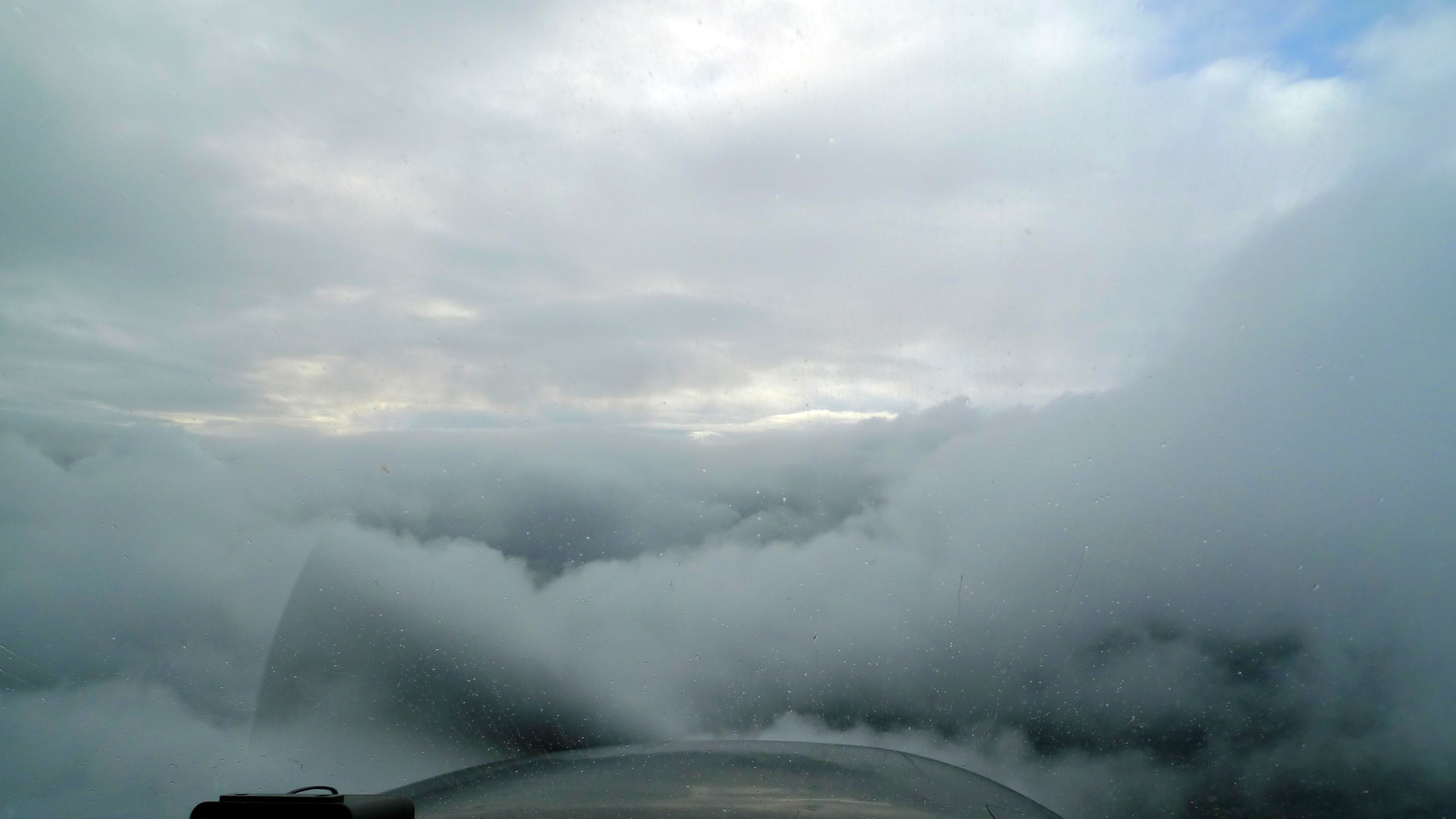
IFR in between cloud layers in a Cessna 172

In aviation, instrument flight rules (IFR) is one of two sets of regulations governing all aspects of civil aviation aircraft operations; the other is visual flight rules (VFR).

The U.S. Federal Aviation Administration's (FAA) Instrument Flying Handbook defines IFR as: "Rules and regulations established by the FAA to govern flight under conditions in which flight by outside visual reference is not safe. IFR flight depends upon flying by reference to instruments in the flight deck, and navigation is accomplished by reference to electronic signals." It is also a term used by pilots and controllers to indicate the type of flight plan an aircraft is flying, such as an IFR or VFR flight plan.

== Basic information ==
=== Comparison to visual flight rules ===
It is possible and fairly straightforward, in relatively clear weather conditions, to fly an aircraft solely by reference to outside visual cues, such as the horizon to maintain orientation, nearby buildings and terrain features for navigation, and other aircraft to maintain separation. This is known as operating the aircraft under visual flight rules (VFR), and is the most common mode of operation for small aircraft. However, it is safe to fly VFR only when these outside references can be clearly seen from a sufficient distance. When flying through or above clouds, or in fog, rain, dust or similar low-level weather conditions, these references can be obscured. Thus, cloud ceiling and flight visibility are the most important variables for safe operations during all phases of flight. The minimum weather conditions for ceiling and visibility for VFR flights are defined in Federal Aviation Regulations (FAR) Part 91.155, and vary depending on the type of airspace in which the aircraft is operating, and on whether the flight is conducted during daytime or nighttime. However, typical daytime VFR minimums for most airspace is 3 statute miles of flight visibility and a distance from clouds of 500 feet below, 1,000 feet above, and 2,000 feet horizontally. Flight conditions reported as equal to or greater than these VFR minimums are referred to as visual meteorological conditions (VMC).

Any aircraft operating under VFR must have the required equipment on board, as described in FAR Part 91.205 (which includes some instruments necessary for IFR flight). VFR pilots may use cockpit instruments as secondary aids to navigation and orientation, but are not required to; the view outside of the aircraft is the primary source for keeping the aircraft straight and level (orientation), flying to the intended destination (navigation), and avoiding obstacles and hazards (separation).

Visual flight rules are generally simpler than instrument flight rules, and require significantly less training and practice. VFR provides a great degree of freedom, allowing pilots to go where they want, when they want, and allows them a much wider latitude in determining how they get there.

=== Instrument flight rules ===
When operation of an aircraft under VFR is not safe, because the visual cues outside the aircraft are obscured by weather, instrument flight rules must be used instead. IFR permits an aircraft to operate in instrument meteorological conditions (IMC), which is essentially any weather condition less than VMC but in which aircraft can still operate safely. Use of instrument flight rules is also required when flying in "Class A" airspace regardless of weather conditions. Class A airspace extends from 18,000 feet above mean sea level to flight level 600 (60,000 feet pressure altitude) above the contiguous 48 United States and overlying the waters within 12 miles thereof. Flight in Class A airspace requires pilots and aircraft to be instrument equipped and rated and to be operating under instrument flight rules (IFR). In many countries commercial airliners and their pilots must operate under IFR as the majority of flights enter Class A airspace. Procedures and training are significantly more complex compared to VFR instruction, as a pilot must demonstrate competency in conducting an entire cross-country flight solely by reference to instruments.

Instrument pilots must carefully evaluate weather, create a detailed flight plan based around specific instrument departure, en route, and arrival procedures, and dispatch the flight.

== Separation and clearance ==
The distance by which an aircraft avoids obstacles or other aircraft is termed separation. The most important concept of IFR flying is that separation is maintained regardless of weather conditions. In controlled airspace, air traffic control (ATC) separates IFR aircraft from obstacles and other aircraft using a flight clearance based on route, time, distance, speed, and altitude. ATC monitors IFR flights on radar, or through aircraft position reports in areas where radar coverage is not available. Aircraft position reports are sent as voice radio transmissions. In the United States, a flight operating under IFR is required to provide position reports unless ATC advises a pilot that the plane is in radar contact. The pilot must resume position reports after ATC advises that radar contact has been lost, or that radar services are terminated.

IFR flights in controlled airspace require an ATC clearance for each part of the flight. A clearance always specifies a clearance limit, which is the farthest the aircraft can fly without a new clearance. In addition, a clearance typically provides a heading or route to follow, altitude, and communication parameters, such as frequencies and transponder codes.

In uncontrolled airspace, ATC clearances are unavailable. In some states a form of separation is provided to certain aircraft in uncontrolled airspace as far as is practical (often known under ICAO as an advisory service in class G airspace), but separation is not mandated nor widely provided.

Despite the protection offered by flight in controlled airspace under IFR, the ultimate responsibility for the safety of the aircraft rests with the pilot in command, who can refuse clearances.

== Weather ==
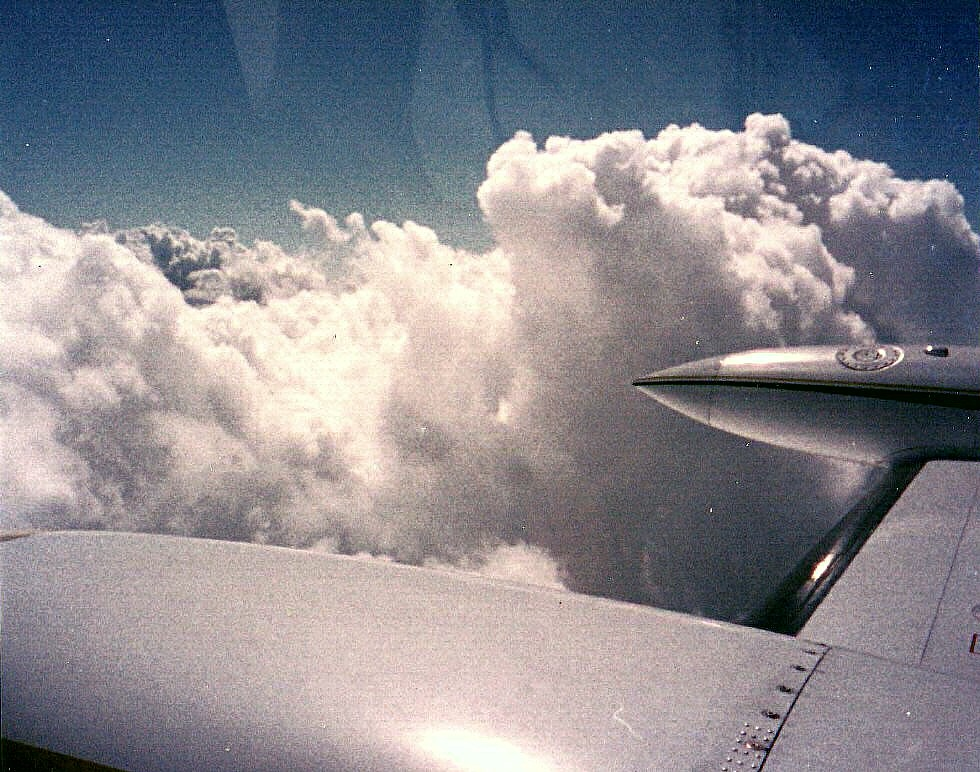
IFR flying with clouds below

It is essential to differentiate between flight plan type (VFR or IFR) and weather conditions (VMC or IMC). While current and forecast weather may be a factor in deciding which type of flight plan to file, weather conditions themselves do not affect one's filed flight plan. For example, an IFR flight that encounters visual meteorological conditions (VMC) en route does not automatically change to a VFR flight, and the flight must still follow all IFR procedures regardless of weather conditions. In the US, weather conditions are forecast broadly as VFR, MVFR (marginal visual flight rules), IFR, or LIFR (low instrument flight rules).

The main purpose of IFR is the safe operation of aircraft in instrument meteorological conditions (IMC). The weather is considered to be MVFR or IMC when it does not meet the minimum requirements for visual meteorological conditions (VMC). To operate safely in IMC ("actual instrument conditions"), a pilot controls the aircraft relying on flight instruments and ATC provides separation.

It is important not to confuse IFR with IMC. A significant amount of IFR flying is conducted in visual meteorological conditions (VMC). Anytime a flight is operating in VMC and in a volume of airspace in which VFR traffic can operate, the crew is responsible for seeing and avoiding VFR traffic; however, because the flight is conducted under instrument flight rules, ATC still provides separation services from other IFR traffic, and can in many cases also advise the crew of the location of VFR traffic near the flight path.

Although dangerous and illegal, a certain amount of VFR flying is conducted in IMC. A scenario is a VFR pilot taking off in VMC conditions, but encountering deteriorating visibility while en route. Continued VFR flight into IMC can lead to spatial disorientation of the pilot which is the cause of a significant number of general aviation crashes. VFR flight into IMC is distinct from "VFR-on-top", an IFR procedure in which the aircraft operates in VMC using a hybrid of VFR and IFR rules, and "VFR over the top", a VFR procedure in which the aircraft takes off and lands in VMC but flies above an intervening area of IMC. Also possible in many countries is "Special VFR" flight, where an aircraft is explicitly granted permission to operate VFR within the controlled airspace of an airport in conditions technically less than VMC; the pilot asserts they have the necessary visibility to fly despite the weather, must stay in contact with ATC, and cannot leave controlled airspace while still below VMC minimums.

During flight under IFR, there are no visibility requirements, so flying through clouds (or other conditions where there is zero visibility outside the aircraft) is legal and safe. However, there are still minimum weather conditions that must be present in order for the aircraft to take off or to land; these vary according to the kind of operation, the type of navigation aids available, the location and height of terrain and obstructions in the vicinity of the airport, equipment on the aircraft, and the qualifications of the crew. For example, Reno-Tahoe International Airport (KRNO) in a mountainous region has significantly different instrument approaches for aircraft landing on the same runway surface, but from opposite directions. Aircraft approaching from the north must make visual contact with the airport at a higher altitude than when approaching from the south because of rapidly rising terrain south of the airport. This higher altitude allows a flight crew to clear the obstacle if a landing is aborted. In general, each specific instrument approach specifies the minimum weather conditions to permit landing.

Although large airliners, and increasingly, smaller aircraft, carry their own terrain awareness and warning system (TAWS), these are primarily backup systems providing a last layer of defense if a sequence of errors or omissions causes a dangerous situation.

== Navigation ==
Because IFR flights often take place without visual reference to the ground, a means of navigation other than looking outside the window is required. A number of navigational aids are available to pilots, including ground-based systems such as VORs, DMEs, and localizers for enroute flight. Glideslope transmitters are used in the final approach segment of instrument landing system (ILS) approaches. Historically, NDBs were commonly used, but they have largely gone out of service and are now found very infrequently and sporadically across the United States. The FAA plans to decommission all remaining NDBs by 2030. In recent years, satellite-based GPS/GNSS systems have become much more popular. Air traffic control may assist in navigation by assigning pilots specific headings ("radar vectors"). The majority of IFR navigation is given by ground- and satellite-based systems, while radar vectors are usually reserved by ATC for sequencing aircraft for a busy approach or transitioning aircraft from takeoff to cruise, among other things.

== Procedures ==
Specific procedures allow IFR aircraft to transition safely through every stage of flight. These procedures specify how an IFR pilot should respond, even in the event of a complete radio failure, and loss of communications with ATC, including the expected aircraft course and altitude.

Departures are described in an IFR clearance issued by ATC prior to takeoff. The departure clearance may contain an assigned heading, one or more waypoints, and an initial altitude to fly. The clearance can also specify a departure procedure (DP) or standard instrument departure (SID) that should be followed unless "NO DP" is specified in the notes section of the filed flight plan.

En route flight is described by IFR charts showing navigation aids, fixes, and standard routes called airways. Aircraft with appropriate navigational equipment such as GPS, are also often cleared for a direct-to routing, where only the destination, or a few navigational waypoints are used to describe the route that the flight will follow. ATC will assign altitudes in its initial clearance or amendments thereto, and navigational charts indicate minimum safe altitudes for airways.

The approach portion of an IFR flight may begin with a standard terminal arrival route (STAR), describing common routes to fly to arrive at an initial approach fix (IAF) from which an instrument approach commences. An instrument approach terminates either by the pilot acquiring sufficient visual reference to proceed to the runway, or with a missed approach because the required visual reference is not seen in time.

== Qualifications ==
=== Pilot ===
To fly under IFR, a pilot must have an instrument rating and must be current (meet recency of experience requirements). In the United States, to file and fly under IFR, a pilot must be instrument-rated and, within the preceding six months, have flown six instrument approaches, as well as holding procedures and course interception and tracking with navaids. Flight under IFR beyond six months after meeting these requirements is not permitted; however, currency may be reestablished within the next six months by completing the requirements above. Beyond the twelfth month, examination ("instrument proficiency check") by an instructor is required.

Practicing instrument approaches can be done either in the instrument meteorological conditions or in visual meteorological conditions – in the latter case, a safety pilot is required so that the pilot practicing instrument approaches can wear a view-limiting device which restricts their field of view to the instrument panel. A safety pilot's primary duty is to observe and avoid other traffic.

In the UK, an IR (UK restricted) - formerly the "IMC rating" - which permits flight under IFR in airspace classes B to G in instrument meteorological conditions, a non-instrument-rated pilot can also elect to fly under IFR in visual meteorological conditions outside controlled airspace. Compared to the rest of the world, the UK's flight crew licensing regime is somewhat unusual in its licensing for meteorological conditions and airspace, rather than flight rules.

=== Aircraft ===
The aircraft must be equipped and type-certified for instrument flight, and the related navigational equipment must have been inspected or tested within a specific period of time prior to the instrument flight.

In the United States, instruments required for IFR flight in addition to those that are required for VFR flight are: heading indicator, sensitive altimeter adjustable for barometric pressure, clock with a sweep-second pointer or digital equivalent, attitude indicator, radios and suitable avionics for the route to be flown, alternator or generator, gyroscopic rate-of-turn indicator that is either a turn coordinator or the turn and bank indicator. From 1999 single-engine helicopters could not be FAA-certified for IFR. Recently, however, Bell and Leonardo have certified the single engine helicopters for instrument flight rules.

== See also ==
- Index of aviation articles
- Acronyms and abbreviations in avionics
- Aeronautical chart
- Airspace class
- Approach plate
- Autoland
- Autopilot
- Bárány chair
- Distance measuring equipment
- Flight instruments
- Instrument landing system
- Non-directional beacon
- Stress in the aviation industry
- Transponder landing system
- VHF omnidirectional range
