= Critical area (aeronautics) =

Airport area that must be clear to prevent against signal interference

In aviation, a critical area refers to a designated area of an airport that all aircraft, vehicles, persons or physical obstructions must remain clear of when one or more Instrument Landing Systems (ILS) are in use, to protect against signal interference or attenuation that may lead to navigation errors, or accident. Critical areas also protect the ILS system's internal monitoring.

ILS technology delivers two main types of information to pilots. These types include the glideslope (vertical location relative to the designed glide path) and the localizer (lateral position relative to the designed approach course). Each type of information is broadcast using a separate antenna array and each type has a specific critical area:

Sign placed at edge of ILS critical area (often next to pavement markings)

- Localizer critical area – aircraft/vehicles/persons or physical obstructions are not authorized in or over the critical area when an arriving aircraft is between the ILS final approach fix and the airport.
- Glideslope critical area – aircraft/vehicles/persons or physical obstructions are not authorized in or over the critical area when an arriving aircraft is between the ILS final approach fix and the airport unless the aircraft has reported the airport in sight and is circling or sidestepping to land on a runway other than the ILS runway.

For practical purposes, these two areas are combined into the ILS critical area and identified by signs and pavement markings.

During times of reduced ceilings and visibility (800 ft/2 miles) or during ILS autoland (coupled) approaches pilots are expected to:

- Before takeoff – stop aircraft before entering the critical area while waiting for takeoff.
- After landing – move the aircraft out of the critical area before stopping to receive taxi instructions from the ground controller.

Much larger than the critical area is the sensitive area. Aircraft and vehicles are not allowed in this area when low visibility procedures are in force, since aircraft autoland during this time and therefore the accuracy of the guidance signals provided by the ILS is absolutely critical.

Multipathing is a potential error in the ILS system, which may affect the glideslope and/or the localizer. This occurs when the radio signals reaching the aircraft are distorted because a large metal object moves into the radiation zone of the transmitter, such as when an aircraft is flying ahead or a taxiing aircraft or truck enters the ILS critical area.
