= Initial approach fix =

Initial approach starting point of an instrument approach

The Initial Approach Fix (IAF) is the point where the initial approach segment of an instrument approach begins. An instrument approach procedure may have more than one Initial approach fix and initial approach segment. The initial approach fix is usually a designated intersection, VHF omnidirectional range (VOR), non-directional beacon (NDB), or distance measuring equipment (DME) fix. The initial approach fix may be collocated with the intermediate fix (IF) of the instrument approach and in such case they designate the beginning of the intermediate segment of the approach. When the initial approach fix and the intermediate fix are combined, there is no initial approach segment.
