= Holding (aeronautics) =

Aeronautic procedure

A standard holding pattern. Shown are the entry (green), the holding fix (red) and the holding pattern itself (blue)

In aviation, holding (or flying a hold) is a maneuver designed to delay an aircraft already in flight while keeping it within a specified airspace; i.e. "going in circles."

== Implementation ==
A holding pattern for instrument flight rules (IFR) aircraft is usually a racetrack pattern based on a holding fix. This fix can be a radio beacon such as a non-directional beacon (NDB) or VHF omnidirectional range (VOR). The fix is the start of the first turn of the racetrack pattern. Aircraft will fly towards the fix, and once there will enter a predefined racetrack pattern. A standard holding pattern uses right-hand turns and takes approximately 4 minutes to complete (one minute for each 180-degree turn, and two one-minute straight ahead sections). Deviations from this pattern can happen if long delays are expected; longer legs (usually two or three minutes) may be used, or aircraft with distance measuring equipment (DME) may be assigned patterns with legs defined in nautical miles rather than minutes. Additionally, if there is wind, the pilot is expected to adjust the outbound timing so that the inbound leg can be flown in 1 minute, or 1.5 minutes if it is above 14,000 ft.

== History ==
The 1965 framework standardized such matters as holding speeds, turn performance, outbound timing, wind correction and the construction of protected holding airspace. Procedure designers could consequently account systematically for aircraft speed, turn radius, navigation tolerances, wind and pilot reaction time when determining the area requiring obstacle protection. These principles formed the basis of the modern holding system, although the rules were subsequently amended. In 1979, the material was divided between the operational instructions for pilots and the criteria used to design and protect holding airspace. Later revisions added procedures for VOR/DME, area-navigation and satellite-based holds, while retaining the conventional racetrack pattern as the basis of the procedure.

== Usage ==
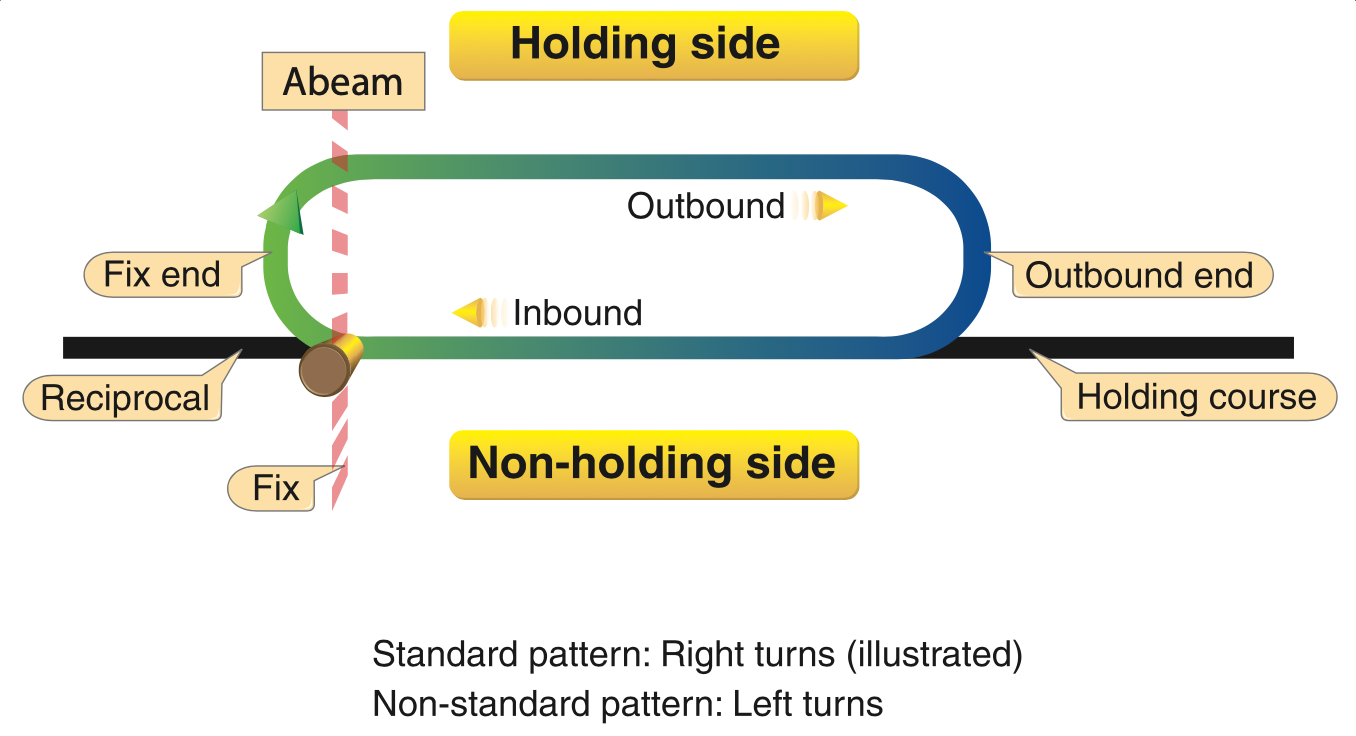
Standard holding pattern

The primary use of a holding pattern is to delay aircraft that have arrived at their destination but cannot land yet because of traffic congestion, poor weather, or runway unavailability (for instance, during snow removal or emergencies). Normally, when no delay is anticipated, ATC issues holding instructions at least 5 minutes before the estimated arrival at the fix. If an aircraft arrives at a clearance limit before receiving clearance beyond the fix, ATC expects the pilot to maintain the last assigned altitude and begin holding in accordance with the charted holding pattern.

=== Stacks ===
Several aircraft may fly the same holding pattern at the same time, separated vertically by 300 m (1,000 ft) or more. This is generally described as a stack or holding stack. As a rule, new arrivals will be added at the top. The aircraft at the bottom of the stack will be taken out and allowed to make an approach first, after which all aircraft in the stack move down one level, and so on. Air traffic control (ATC) will control the whole process, in some cases using a dedicated controller (called a stack controller) for each individual pattern. One airport may have several holding patterns; depending on where aircraft arrive from or which runway is in use, or because of vertical airspace limitations.

Since an aircraft with an emergency has priority over all other air traffic, it will always be allowed to bypass the holding pattern and go directly to the airport (if possible). This causes more delays for other aircraft already in the stack.

=== In absence of charted holding pattern ===
If no holding pattern is charted and holding instructions have not been issued, pilots are expected to enter a standard holding pattern on the course on which the aircraft approached the fix and request further clearance as soon as possible. ATC will clear the aircraft with information including: direction of the hold in terms of the eight cardinal and ordinal directions, holding fix, course, leg length, direction of turn, and time to expect further clearance.

== Entry procedures ==
The entry to a holding pattern is often the hardest part for a novice pilot to grasp, and determining and executing the proper entry while simultaneously controlling the aircraft, navigating and communicating with ATC requires practice. There are three standard types of entries: direct, parallel, and offset (teardrop). The proper entry procedure is determined by the angle difference between the direction the aircraft flies to arrive at the beacon and the direction of the inbound leg of the holding pattern.

- A direct entry is performed just as its name would suggest: the aircraft flies directly to the holding fix, and immediately begins the first turn outbound.
- In a parallel entry, the aircraft flies to the holding fix, parallels the inbound course for one minute outbound, and then turns back, re-intercepting the inbound track, and continues in the hold from there.
- In an offset or teardrop entry, the aircraft flies to the holding fix, turns into the protected area, flies for one minute, and then turns back inbound, proceeding to the fix and continuing from there.
Standard holding entry diagrams

Direct entry (Sector 3)

Parallel entry (Sector 1)

Teardrop entry (Sector 2)

The parallel and teardrop entry are mirrored in case of a left-hand holding pattern.

== Speed limits ==
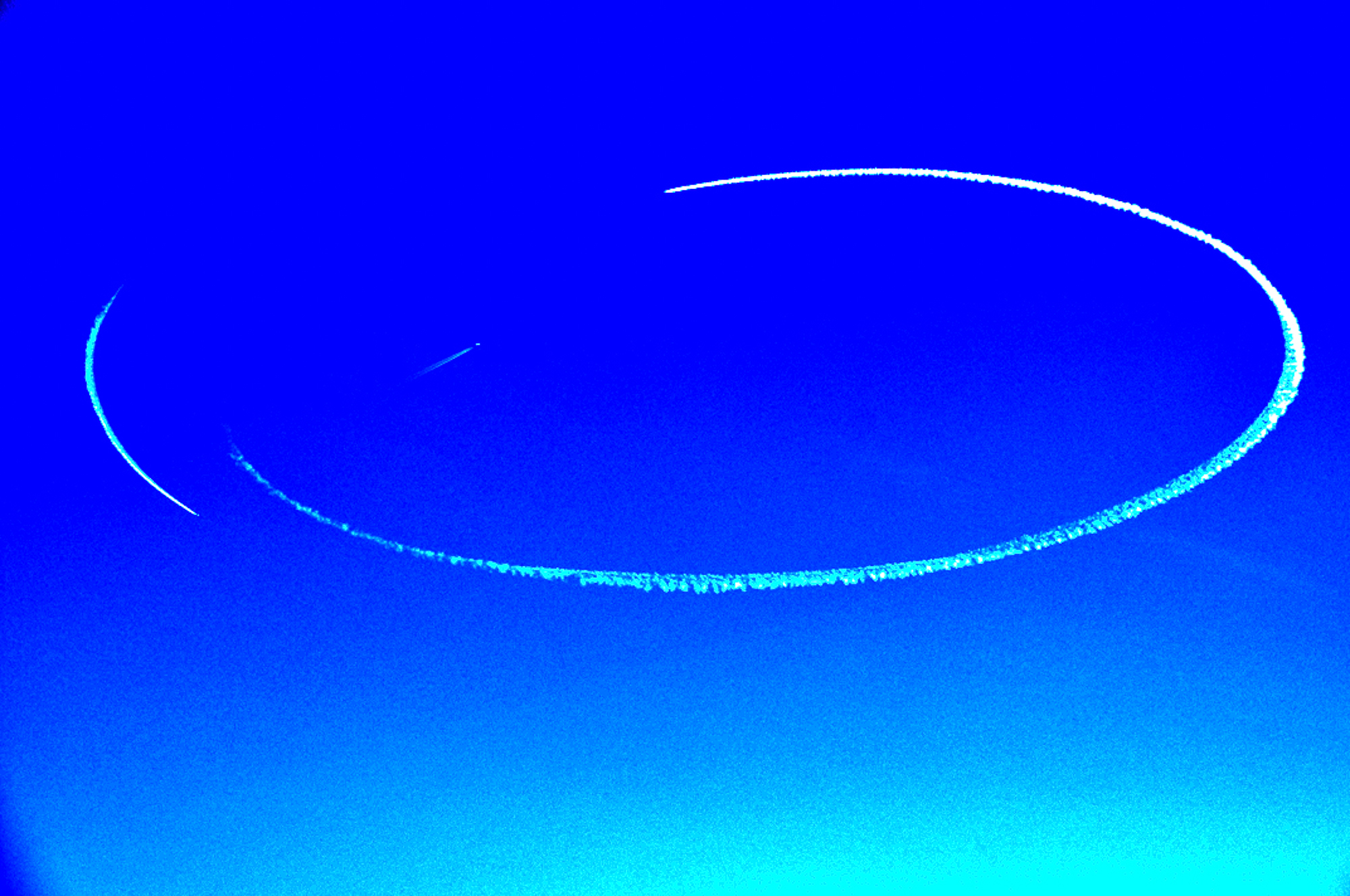
Contrails left by an aeroplane in holding pattern

Maximum holding airspeeds (MHA) are established to keep aircraft within the protected holding area during their one-minute (one-minute and a half above 4,300 m (14,000 ft) MSL) inbound and outbound legs. For civil aircraft (not military) in the United States and Canada, these airspeeds are:

- Up to 1,800 m (6,000 ft) MSL: 200 KIAS
- From 1,829 to 4,267 m (6,001 to 14,000 ft) MSL: 230 KIAS
  - May be restricted to 210 KIAS in some situations
- 4,268 m (14,001 ft) MSL and above: 265 KIAS

The ICAO Maximum holding speeds:

- Up to 4,300 m (14,000 ft): 430 km/h (230 kn)
- 4,300 to 6,100 m (14,000 to 20,000 ft): 440 km/h (240 kn)
- 6,100 to 10,400 m (20,000 to 34,000 ft): 491 km/h (265 kn)
- Above 10,000 m (34,000 ft): M0.83

With their higher performance characteristics, military aircraft have higher holding speed limits. Pilots are expected to notify the ATC if they are unable to comply with the speed restrictions.

== See also ==
- Heathrow arrival stacks
- Flight planning
- Loiter
