= Missed approach =

Emergency aircraft procedure

Terminal procedures for an ILS approach, including Missed Approach instructions (highlighted in red).

Missed approach, also called going missed, is a procedure followed by a pilot when an instrument approach cannot be completed to a full-stop landing.

== Initiation ==
A missed approach may be either initiated by the pilot or instructed by air traffic control (ATC).

The instructions for the missed approach may be assigned by ATC prior to the clearance for the approach. If ATC has not issued specific instructions prior to the approach and a missed approach is executed, the pilot must follow the (default) missed approach procedure specified for the approach. Prior to commencing the approach, pilots can make a specific request to ATC if a missed approach may occur. Such a request may include heading and altitude instructions to avoid in-flight delays (such as holds) and efficiently maneuver the aircraft into position for either its next approach or a diversion to an alternate airport.

Generally, if a pilot determines by the time the aircraft is at the decision height (for a precision approach) or missed approach point (for a non-precision approach), that the runway or its environment is not in sight, (Note: This refers to any one of the following: 1. Approach light system; 2. Threshold; 3. Threshold markings; 4. Threshold lights; 5. Runway end identifier lights (REIL); 6. Visual approach slope indicators (VASI); 7. Touchdown zone or touchdown zone markings; 8. Touchdown zone lights; 9. Runway or runway markings; 10. Runway lights) or that a safe landing cannot be accomplished for any reason, the landing approach must be discontinued and the missed approach procedure (a "go-around") must be immediately initiated. It is also common for pilots to practice a missed approach as part of initial or recurrent instrument training. In such cases, a pilot may execute multiple instrument approaches in a row, with missed approaches between them.

== Flying ==
The missed approach procedure normally includes an initial heading or track to follow, and altitude to climb to, typically followed by holding instructions at a nearby navigation fix. The pilot is expected to inform ATC by radio of the initiation of the missed approach as soon as possible. ATC may simply acknowledge the missed approach call or modify the missed approach instructions, for example, with vectors to another fix. ATC may subsequently clear the flight for another approach at the same airport or clear it to an alternative airport, depending on the pilot's intentions as well as fuel, weather and traffic considerations.

== Alternate missed approach ==
When a ground-based NAVAID used in an missed approach procedure is out of service, instead of having the entire instrument approach procedure unusable, an alternate missed approach procedure may be used. Such alternate procedure may use NAVAIDs not used in the approach procedure or the primary missed approach. To avoid confusion, the alternate procedure are not published on the procedure chart, though the missed approach holding pattern is still charted.

== See also ==
- Index of aviation articles
- List of aviation mnemonics
