= Approach plate =

Publication of an aircraft landing procedure

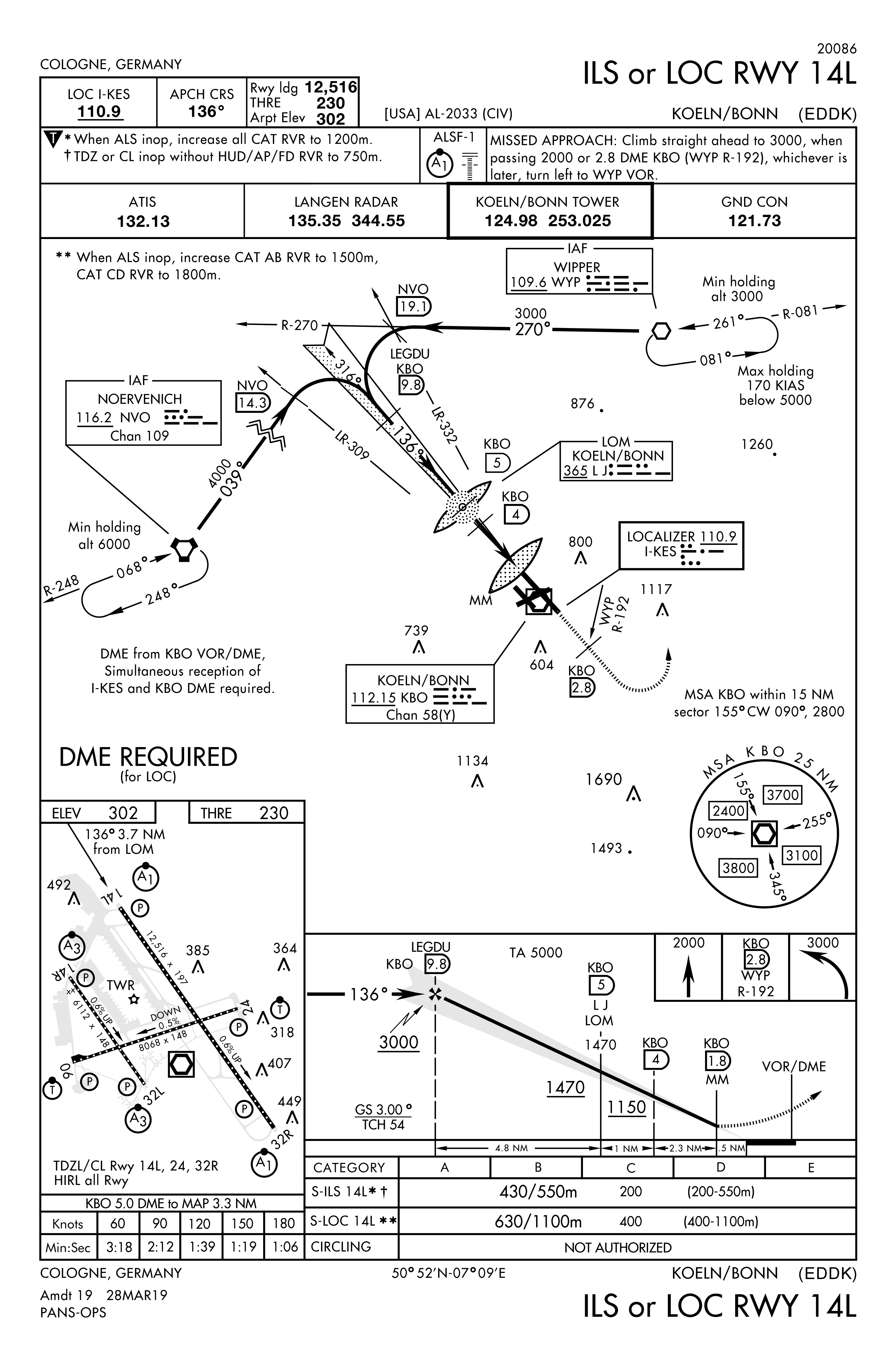
An approach plate for the ILS or LOC approach to runway 14L at Cologne Bonn Airport, Germany.

Approach plates (or, more formally, instrument approach procedure charts) are the printed or digital charts of instrument approach procedures that pilots use to fly instrument approaches during instrument flight rules (IFR) operations. Each country maintains its own instrument approach procedures according to International Civil Aviation Organization (ICAO) standards.

Approach plates are published by each country. In addition, several commercial providers produce plates in alternative formats, including Jeppesen and NAVBLUE.

Approach plates are essential if an aircraft is to make a safe landing during instrument meteorological conditions (IMC) such as a low ceiling or reduced visibility due to conditions such as fog, rain or snow. In addition to the waypoints, altitudes and minimum visibility requirements necessary to line up an aircraft with a designated runway for landing, they also provide important navigational information such as course headings and navigational aids' radio frequencies. This information allows an aircraft to safely transition from the en route airway segment (which provides guidance for safe flight between the flight origination and destination) through the terminal environment (where aircraft transition from the en route airway segment to the airspace in the immediate vicinity of the airport) to a safe landing on the designated runway.

Because of the importance of maintaining up-to-date information about the often changing environment around airports (e.g., vertical obstructions to air traffic, such as cranes, can be erected at short notice), approach plates are published with expiration dates and are reviewed on a frequent basis. Since approach plates often contain extra information relative to the procedure they depict (e.g. vertical obstructions in the chart's planform are usually not part of the procedure itself, but are rather depicted for pilot's situational awareness), some of the updates are done purely because of the changing environment around airports, in which case none of the procedural elements (altitudes, courses, etc.) are changed. Anytime the procedure is changed, the plate is re-issued with the updated information.

== Etymology ==
The reference to "plate" originates from the page-by-page preparations used in printing, or the aspect of the approach map, being round, with concentric circles, looks like a plate.

== United States of America ==
In the United States, these procedures are published by the Federal Aviation Administration and military services. Generally, instrument approach procedures to civil airports are approved by the FAA, and instrument approach procedures to military airports in the U.S. are approved by the appropriate military service. The FAA may also approve private instrument approaches to private airports or heliports for authorized users of these private facilities. These private instrument approach procedures are generally not published but are made available to authorized users.

The FAA publishes these terminal charts for IFR procedures. The U.S. terminal procedures publication includes Instrument approach procedure (IAP) charts, airport diagrams, standard instrument departure procedures (DP), standard terminal arrival (STAR) charts, and charted visual flight procedure (CVFP) charts.

The instrument approach procedure chart includes margin identification information, briefing strip information, planview, missed approach information, profile view, landing minimums, and an airport sketch. The margin identification includes the airport location, procedure identification, and chart currency. The top briefing strip lists the primary navigation type, identifier and frequency/channel, the final approach course, and information about the landing runway. The middle briefing strip includes procedure notes, the approach lighting system, and the missed approach procedure text. The bottom briefing strip includes communication information.

The planview is an overhead view of the entire approach procedure shown to scale. It includes approach segments, NAVAIDs, restrictive airspeeds, restrictive altitudes, holding patterns and procedure turns, airports, relief, hydrography, international boundary, obstacles, special use airspace, minimum safe altitude, terminal arrival areas, and helicopter procedures. The missed approach track is shown as a thin hash marked line with a directional arrow. Missed approach icons are in the upper left or right of the profile view.

Landing minimum are listed for either a straight-in landing, or a circling-to-land, for each aircraft approach category. The airport sketch shows the runways drawn to scale and oriented relative to true north.

== Canada ==
In Canada, Nav Canada maintains the Canada Air Pilot (CAP), which contains all Transport Canada-approved approaches. The Restricted Canada Air Pilot (RCAP), contains additional approaches available to commercial operators who have been granted Op Spec 099.

== See also ==
- Index of aviation articles
- Instrument Landing System (ILS)
