= Tactical air navigation system =

Military air navigation system

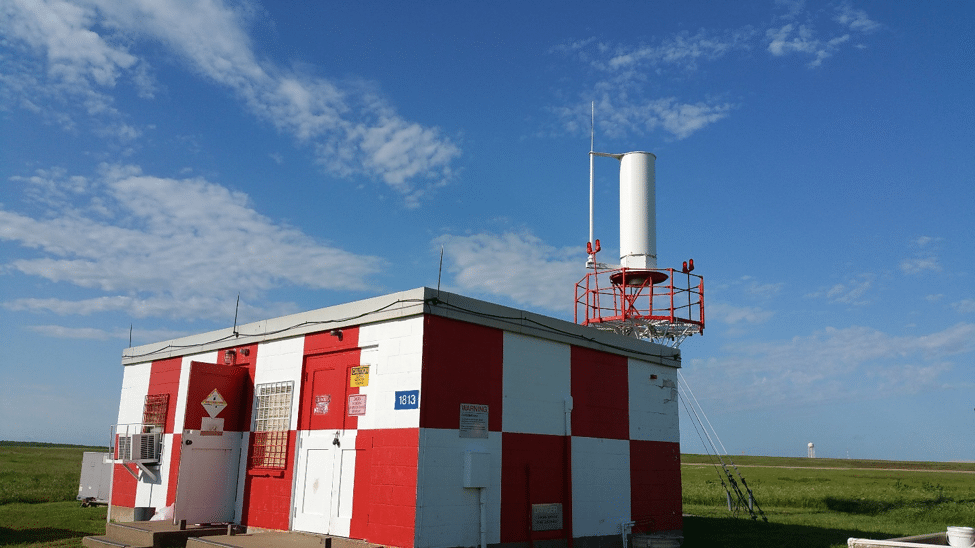
Typical US Air Force TACAN site using a dB Systems Model 900E TACAN Antenna

A tactical air navigation system, commonly referred to by the acronym TACAN, is a navigation system initially designed for naval aircraft to acquire moving landing platforms (i.e., ships) and later expanded for use by other military aircraft. It provides the user with bearing and distance (slant-range or hypotenuse) to a ground or ship-borne station. It is, from an end-user perspective, a more accurate version of the VOR/DME system that provides bearing and range information for civil aviation. Aircraft equipped with TACAN avionics can use this system for enroute navigation as well as non-precision approaches to landing fields.

The distance-measuring portion of TACAN is fully interoperable with civilian DME while the bearing-measurement is not interoperable with VOR. VORTAC facilities combine a VOR with a TACAN so that civilian aircraft can use it as VOR/DME while military aircraft can use it as TACAN. TACAN-only equipped aircraft cannot receive bearing information from a VOR-only station.

== History ==
TACAN symbol on aeronautical charts

In 1945, development of the system commenced with ITT Inc.'s Federal Communications Laboratory under Henri G. Busignies. A 1000 MHz system using a polar coordinate system for direction and distance was identified as project goals.

In February 1946, the Wright Air Development Center produced a study stating a 1000 MHz polar coordinate system using omnidirectional radio range and distance measuring equipment was optimal for short range navigation. In April, ITT was awarded a contract to produce the AN/APN-34 airborne interrogator and the AN/GPN-4 ground beacon. In August, a prototype 3000 MHz bearing and a 1000 MHz distance measuring system was demonstrated.

In June 1947, ITT was awarded a contract by the Rome Laboratory to develop the L.A. deRosa and L. Himmel 1000 MHz omnidirectional radio range with 0.5 degree bearing accuracy. That autumn, S.H. Dodington proposed rotating a reflector around the distance measuring beacon, so as to also provide bearing.

In June 1948, the navy's Bureau of Ships, led by the "Father of the Modern Tacan" J. Loeb, became involved in development when it awarded ITT a contract to replace its YE/YG beacon with an airborne AN/ARN-16 and shipboard AN/URN-1. In 1949, the Air Force started taking delivery of the AN/APN-34, while the navy attached one to its AN/ARN-16.

By the end of 1950, both the air force and the navy agreed on a common combined bearing and distance system. The specifications for this AN/ARN-21 included 126 channels, accuracy of 0.75 degrees, and a range up to 200 nautical miles. In 1951, ITT delivered the 50 channel AN/ARN-21 and AN/URN-3 systems. In September 1952, the 126 channel versions were demonstrated.

Hoffman Laboratories Division of the Hoffman Electronics Corp.–Military Products Division provided services in the 1950s.

== Operation ==
The 1000 MHz omnidirectional range bearing and distance measuring tactical air navigation system includes transponders and beacons. The air to ground distance function consists of 126 two-way channels spaced 1 MHz apart between 1025 and 1150 MHz. The ground to air bearing and distance functions consist of 63 channels between 962 and 1024 MHz, and another 63 channels between 1151 and 1213 MHz. Pulse coding is used to increase the average power, and multiplexing the bearing function onto the distance channel.

=== Ranging ===
The distance function is based on radar ranging, but instead of using reflections displayed on a scope, timing circuits convert the timing delay between interrogation and reply into the associated distance on a meter. The airborne transmitter sends out narrow, widely spaced interrogation pulses, 2 per second when tracking, and 150 per second when searching. The rate varies in an irregular fashion for each aircraft, so as to prevent interference. A searching process on the aircraft determines which reply pulse time delay corresponds to its interrogation rate. The timing circuits include a memory function that maintains the distance indication for up to 10 seconds without a reply, before initiating a new search. A ground based beacon sends out a constant 2700 pulses per second independent of the number of interrogating aircraft, and a Morse code identifier every 75 seconds. The constant 2700 pulses consist of distance-measurement pulses or random filler pulses. Pulse amplitude modulation contains additional information.

The time difference between interrogation and reply minus the 50 µs ground transponder delay (reply delay), and the pulse spacing of the reply pulses (12 µs in X mode and 30 µs in Y mode), is measured by the interrogator's timing circuitry and converted to a distance measurement (slant range), in nautical miles, then displayed on the cockpit TACAN display.

The distance formula, distance = speed × time, is used by the TACAN receiver to calculate its distance from the TACAN ground station. The speed in the calculation is the propagation speed of the radio pulse, which is the speed of light (roughly 300,000,000 m/s or 162,000 nmi/s). The time in the calculation is ½(total time − reply delay), hence the distance is c × ½(total time − reply delay), where c is the speed of light.

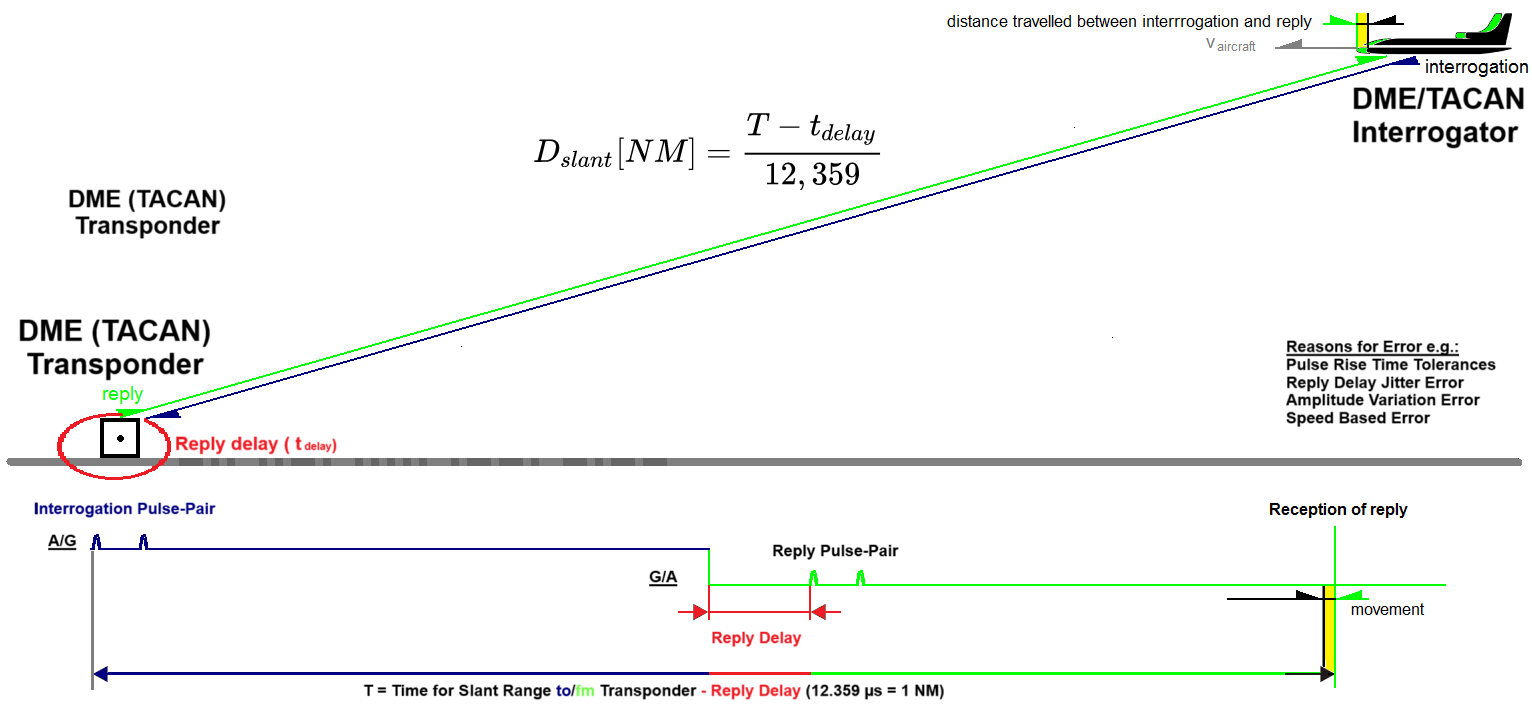
Slant range determination

=== Bearing ===
The course-bearing system uses a vertical ground based transmission antenna. Surrounding this antenna is a 12.7 centimeter diameter rotating insulated cylinder, containing a vertical reflector that distorts the circular radiation pattern into a cardioid with a 15 cycle per second 12 to 30 percent modulation. Bearing corresponds to the phase of the transmitted signal relative to a 15 cycle per second reference transmitted when the cardioid points due east. The reference consists of 12 pulses spaced 30 microseconds apart, picked up by an aircraft with a pulse group decoder. The phase measurement associated with the bearing search may take up to 20 seconds, but after locking onto the reference signal the system goes into tracking mode. Bearing search starts automatically once a ground beacon channel is selected. An outer 84 centimeter diameter rotating insulated cylinder contains nine equally spaced vertical reflectors. Rotating at the same rate, this cylinder produces nine minor lobes on the cardioid pattern, referred to as a ninth harmonic component of the inner cylinder sine wave. The reference signal for this outer cylinder consists of 6 pulses 24 microseconds apart. The higher 135 cycles per second frequency provides a fine bearing measurement, compared to the coarse 15 cycles per second measurement of the inner cylinder.

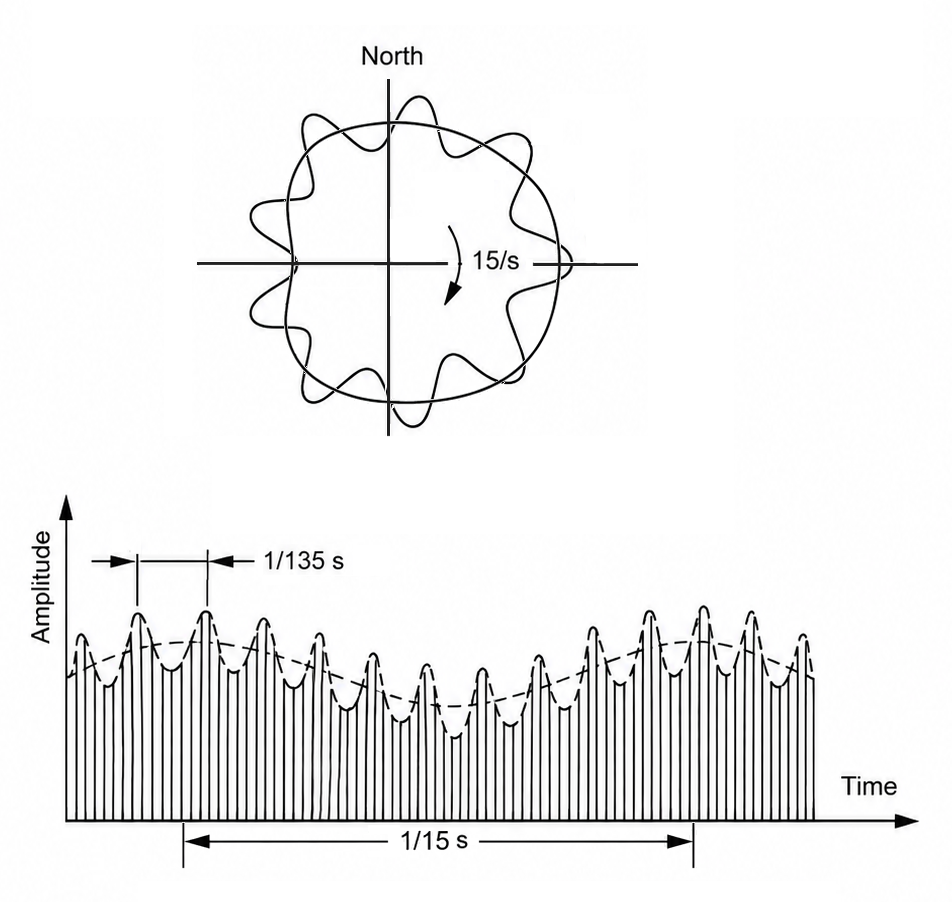
Rotating radiation pattern of the TACAN ground transmitter and resulting receive signal

=== Operating modes ===
There are two basic channel configurations available: X (the original implementation) and Y (added in the 1960s to expand available channels and reduce mutual interference between closely-spaced stations). These configurations differ in pulse-pair width, fixed receiver response delay, and polarity of frequency offset from the interrogation channel. TACAN interrogators can operate in four modes: receive (for bearing/identification only), transmit/receive (for bearing, range, and ID), and air-to-air versions of the previous two.

Rockwell International was issued a patent in 1992 to enable TACAN-equipped aircraft to determine range and bearing to each other utilizing only ranging pulses (without squitter or bearing reference pulse trains), enabling air-to-air rendezvous with reduced power requirements. It is currently unknown if this technology saw commercial application.

TACAN operating specifications, derived from MIL-STD-291C
Channel/operating mode	Interrogator frequency (MHz)/channel	Response frequency offset (±63 MHz)	Interrogator pulse-pair width (μs)	Response delay spacing (μs)	Response pulse-pair width (μs)	Main/auxiliary reference burst length (pulse pairs)	Main/auxiliary reference burst pulse-pair spacing (μs)	Main/auxiliary reference burst synchronization point
X channels, air-to-ground	1025-1150 (1-126)	negative (1-63) positive (64-127)	12	50	12	12/6	12/24	Positive peak of AM signal pointed due east when main burst triggered; auxiliary burst synchronized to same event, but suppressed during main burst transmission
Y channels, air-to-ground	1025-1150 (1-126)	positive (1-63) negative (64-127)	36	74	30	13/13	30/15 (both single pulse)	Positive peak of AM signal pointed due east when main burst triggered; auxiliary burst synchronized to same event, but suppressed during main burst transmission
X channels, air-to-air	1025-1150 (1-126)	positive (1-63) negative (64-127)	12	62	single pulse	Same as air-to-ground, if supported		
Y channels, air-to-air	1025-1150 (1-126)	positive (1-63) negative (64-127)	24	74	single pulse	Same as air-to-ground, if supported		

== Performance and accuracy ==
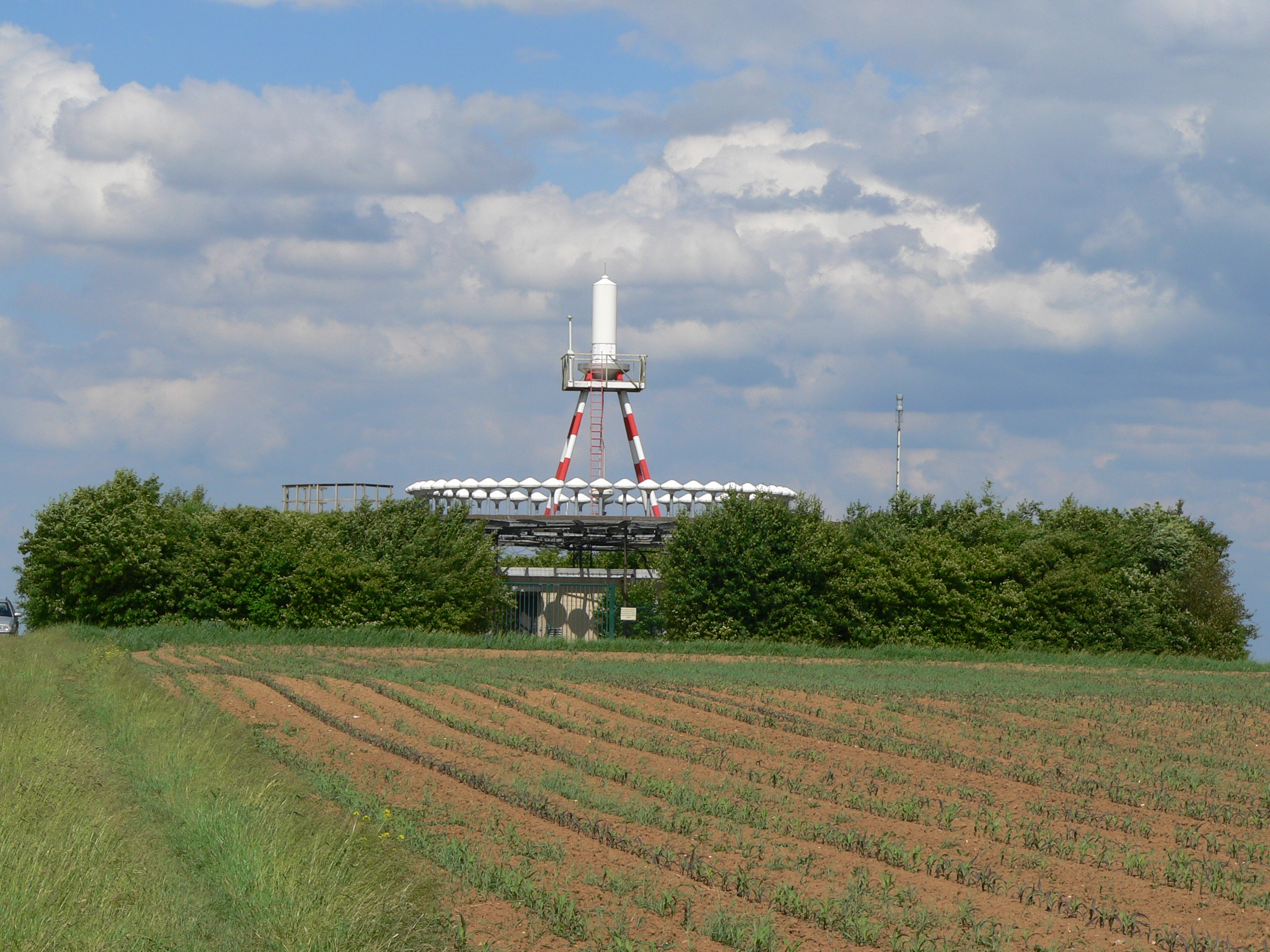
A DVORTAC installation in Germany; the TACAN antenna is elevated above the center DVOR-antenna on the counterpoise.

When initially deployed, TACAN was intended to provide a bearing accuracy of ±0.22°, based on the main bearing signal's own accuracy of ±2° and the corrections applied by the ninth-harmonic auxiliary bearing signal. Theoretically a TACAN should provide a 9-fold increase in accuracy compared to a VOR, but operational use has shown only an approximate 3-fold increase.

Operational accuracy of the 135 Hz azimuth component is ±1° or ±63 m at 3.75 km.

Manufacturers of TACAN sets mention the ability to track stations out to 400NM, though these systems will cap their instrumented range signals at approximately 200NM. Per official FAA service volume information, reliable TACAN/DME reception can be guaranteed out to 130NM below 45,000 feet above the surface for a high-altitude certified unit.

On the first Space Shuttle flight, Capcom Joseph P. Allen reported up to the crew that their TACANs had locked onto the Channel 111X signals at St. Petersburg, FL at a range of 250 miles.

== Benefits ==
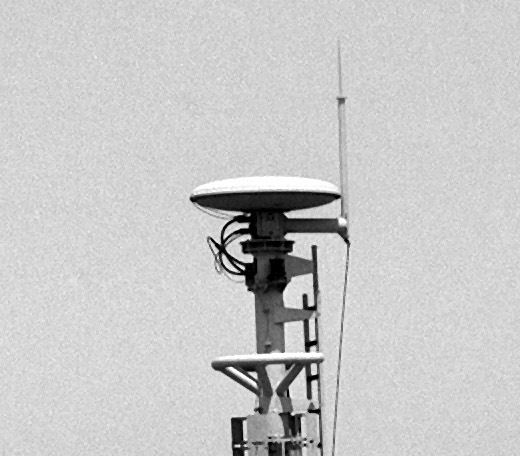
A shipboard TACAN antenna on USS Raleigh (LPD-1) with a lightning rod extending above it

Because the azimuth and range units are combined in one system it provides for simpler installation. Less space is required than a VOR because a VOR requires a large counterpoise and a fairly complex phased antenna system. A TACAN system theoretically might be placed on a building, a large truck, an airplane or a ship, and be operational in a short period of time. An airborne TACAN receiver can be used in air-to-air mode to provide the approximate distance between two coordinating aircraft by selecting channels with 63 channels of separation (e.g., aircraft #1 sets channel 29 into its TACAN and aircraft #2 sets channel 92 into its TACAN.). It does not provide relative bearing.

== Drawbacks ==
For military usage a primary drawback is lack of the ability to control emissions (EMCON) and stealth. Naval TACAN operations are designed so an aircraft can find the ship and land. Since there is no encryption, an enemy can use the range and bearing provided to attack a ship equipped with a TACAN. Some TACANs have the ability to employ a "Demand Only" mode: only transmitting when interrogated by an aircraft on-channel. It is likely that TACAN will be replaced with a differential GPS system similar to the Local Area Augmentation System called JPALS. The Joint Precision Approach and Landing System has a low probability of intercept to prevent enemy detection and an aircraft carrier version can be used for autoland operations.

Some systems used in the United States modulate the transmitted signal by using a 900 RPM rotating antenna. This antenna is fairly large and must rotate 24 hours a day, possibly causing reliability issues. Modern systems have antennas that use electronic rotation (instead of mechanical rotation), hence no moving parts.

== Integration with modern navigation systems ==
=== Sensor fusion ===
In some military operations, TACAN is also used in conjunction with inertial and satellite navigation to provide multi-sensor navigation redundancy and improved accuracy.

== See also ==
- Battle of Lima Site 85 (SAC TACAN captured March 1968)
- Distance measuring equipment
- Electronics technician
- Global Positioning System
- VHF omnidirectional range
- Wide Area Augmentation System
