= Geographical Names Board of Canada =

Canadian national committee

The Geographical Names Board of Canada (GNBC) is a national committee with a secretariat in Natural Resources Canada, part of the Government of Canada, which authorizes the names used and name changes on official federal government maps of Canada.

== History ==
It was created in December 1897, by Order in Council, as the Geographic Board of Canada. It consisted of one Board member from each of four Government of Canada departments, as well as the Surveyor General of Dominion Lands, while a secretariat was provided by the then-extant Department of the Interior. In December 1899, the Order in Council was amended to give the Canadian provinces and territories the right to nominate one official, each, to be a Board member. The board was succeeded by the Canadian Board on Geographic Names in 1948, then reorganized as the Canadian Permanent Committee on Geographic Names (CPCGN) in 1961.

== Structure ==
As of 2020, the Board consists of 27 members, one from each of the provinces and territories, and others from departments of the Government of Canada. The board also is involved with names of areas in the Antarctic through the Antarctic Treaty. The secretariat is provided by Natural Resources Canada.

In addition to the provincial and territorial members are members from the following federal government departments: Aboriginal Affairs and Northern Development Canada, Canada Post Corporation, Fisheries and Oceans Canada, Elections Canada, Library and Archives Canada, Department of National Defence, Natural Resources Canada (including Geological Survey of Canada and Canada Centre for Mapping and Earth Observation), Parks Canada, Statistics Canada, and the Translation Bureau. The Chair of the Geographical Names Board of Canada is Connie Wyatt Anderson from The Pas, Manitoba.

== Process ==
In a two year period of 2019–2020, 750 names were added to the database with roughly 100 changes to names of already existing places. Citizens and government officials have the ability to write in with a form that is able to be filled out. The local naming authority then becomes involved on the place in question gathering suggestions from the local and indigenous communities. This can include the revival of indigenous names, notable examples include qathet, Haida Gwaii, and the Salish Sea. Provincial governments have also taken liberty to change names, including Nunavut, Ontario, British Columbia, and Quebec. Certain laws may apply such as for regional districts which typically have to include a distinguish geographic feature of the area in its name.

== See also ==
- Federal Information Processing Standard
- GeoBase
- Geographic Names Information System
- GPS·C
