= Joint precision approach and landing system =

US military system for landing aircraft

LAAS architecture, similar in concept to JPALS LDGPS fixed base category

In the United States Armed Forces, the joint precision approach and landing system (JPALS) is an all-weather system for precision guidance of landing aircraft. It is based on real-time differential correction of the Global Positioning System (GPS) signal, augmented with a local area correction message, and transmitted to the user via secure means. It is used on terrestrial airfields as well as the US Navy's amphibious assault ships and aircraft carriers (hull classifications LH and CVN, respectively).

The onboard receiver compares the current GPS-derived position with the local correction signal, deriving a highly accurate three-dimensional position capable of being used for all-weather approaches via an Instrument Landing System-style display. Accuracy, while classified, is believed to be about 1 m or better. While JPALS is similar to Local Area Augmentation System, but intended primarily for use by the military, some elements of JPALS may eventually see their way into civilian use to help protect high-value civilian operations against unauthorized signal alteration.

== History ==
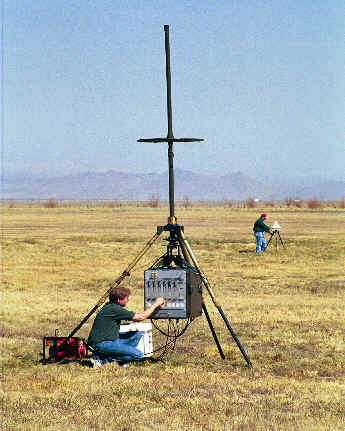
JPALS tactical prototype

The development of JPALS was the result of two main military requirements. First, the military needs an all-service, highly mobile all-weather precision approach system, tailorable to a wide range of environments, from shipboard use to rapid installation at makeshift airfields. Second, they need a robust system that can maintain a high level of reliability in combat operations, particularly in its ability to effectively resist jamming.

== Operation ==
JPALS encompasses two main categories: SRGPS (shipboard relative GPS) and LDGPS (land/local differential GPS). SRGPS provides highly accurate approach positioning for operations aboard ship, including aircraft carriers, helo and STO/VL carriers, and other shipboard operations, primarily helicopter operations.

LDGPS is further divided into three sub-categories: fixed base, tactical, and special missions. Fixed base is used for ongoing operations at military airfields around the world, while the tactical system is portable, designed for relatively short-term, austere airfield operations. The special missions system is a highly portable system capable of rapid installation and use by special forces.

== Accuracy ==
The accuracy of local area augmentation system (LAAS) is better than CAT III ILS accuracy, and will provide horizontal and vertical resolutions of less than 1 m. Although the exact accuracy of JPALS will remain classified, it's estimated that JPALS will meet or exceed this accuracy for authorized users.

== Benefits ==
The main benefit of JPALS is that it's a system that can be taken anywhere, anytime, providing a safe and effective way to conduct 24/7, all-weather, anti-jam instrument landing system capability to all authorized users, worldwide. A secondary benefit is a significant reduction in cost over current systems.

The naval version of JPALS transmits a signal that has a low probability of intercept; so it is unlikely that an enemy will detect the signal and trace it back to its source. The existing system, tactical air navigation (TACAN), is not encrypted or concealed in any way, which can reveal the location of the ship on which it is installed. This is not acceptable in emissions control (EMCON) or stealth conditions.

The increase in both accuracy and reliability will significantly enhance operations while reducing non-operational periods due to weather or adversarial efforts.

== See also ==
- Local area augmentation system is a similar system for civilian usage.
- Wide area augmentation system
- Precision approach
- Instrument landing system
- Global Positioning System
- Differential GPS
- Microwave landing system
- Electronics technician
