= Wide Area Augmentation System =

System that enhances the accuracy of GPS receivers

Wide Area Augmentation System (WAAS)
- Country/ies of origin: United States
- Operator: FAA
- Status: Operational
- Coverage: United States, Canada, Mexico
- Accuracy: 1.0 metre (3.3 ft)

Constellation size
- Current usable satellites: 3
- First launch: 2003; 23 years ago

Orbital characteristics
- Regime: GEO (uses communication satellites)

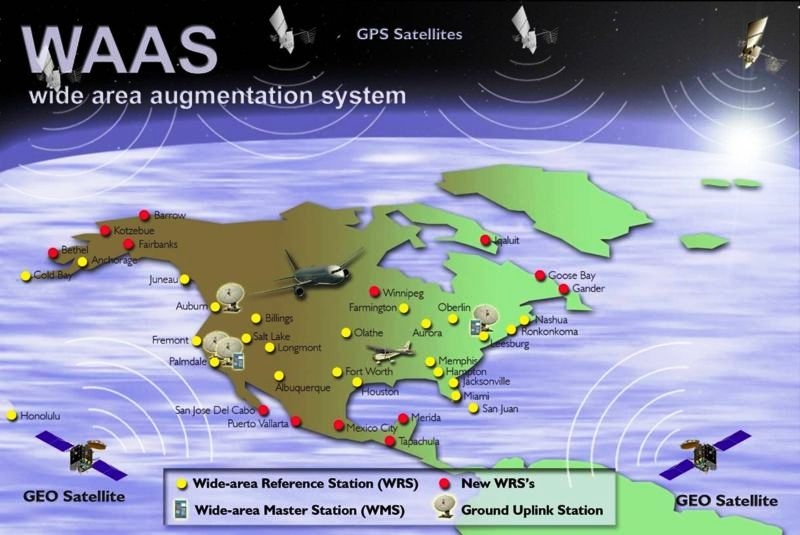
WAAS system overview

The Wide Area Augmentation System (WAAS) is an air navigation aid developed by the Federal Aviation Administration to augment the Global Positioning System (GPS), with the goal of improving its accuracy, integrity, and availability. Essentially, WAAS is intended to enable aircraft to rely on GPS for all phases of flight, including approaches with vertical guidance to any airport within its coverage area. It may be further enhanced with the local-area augmentation system (LAAS) also known by the preferred ICAO term ground-based augmentation system (GBAS) in critical areas.

WAAS uses a network of ground-based reference stations, in North America and Hawaii, to measure small variations in the GPS satellites' signals in the Western Hemisphere. Measurements from the reference stations are routed to master stations, which queue the received deviation correction (DC) and send the correction messages to geostationary WAAS satellites in a timely manner (every 5 seconds or better). Those satellites broadcast the correction messages back to Earth, where WAAS-enabled GPS receivers use the corrections while computing their positions to improve accuracy.

The International Civil Aviation Organization (ICAO) calls this type of system a satellite-based augmentation system (SBAS). Europe and Asia are developing their own SBASs: the Indian GPS aided GEO augmented navigation (GAGAN), the European Geostationary Navigation Overlay Service (EGNOS), the Japanese Multi-functional Satellite Augmentation System (MSAS) and the Russian System for Differential Corrections and Monitoring (SDCM), respectively. Commercial systems include StarFire, OmniSTAR, and Atlas.

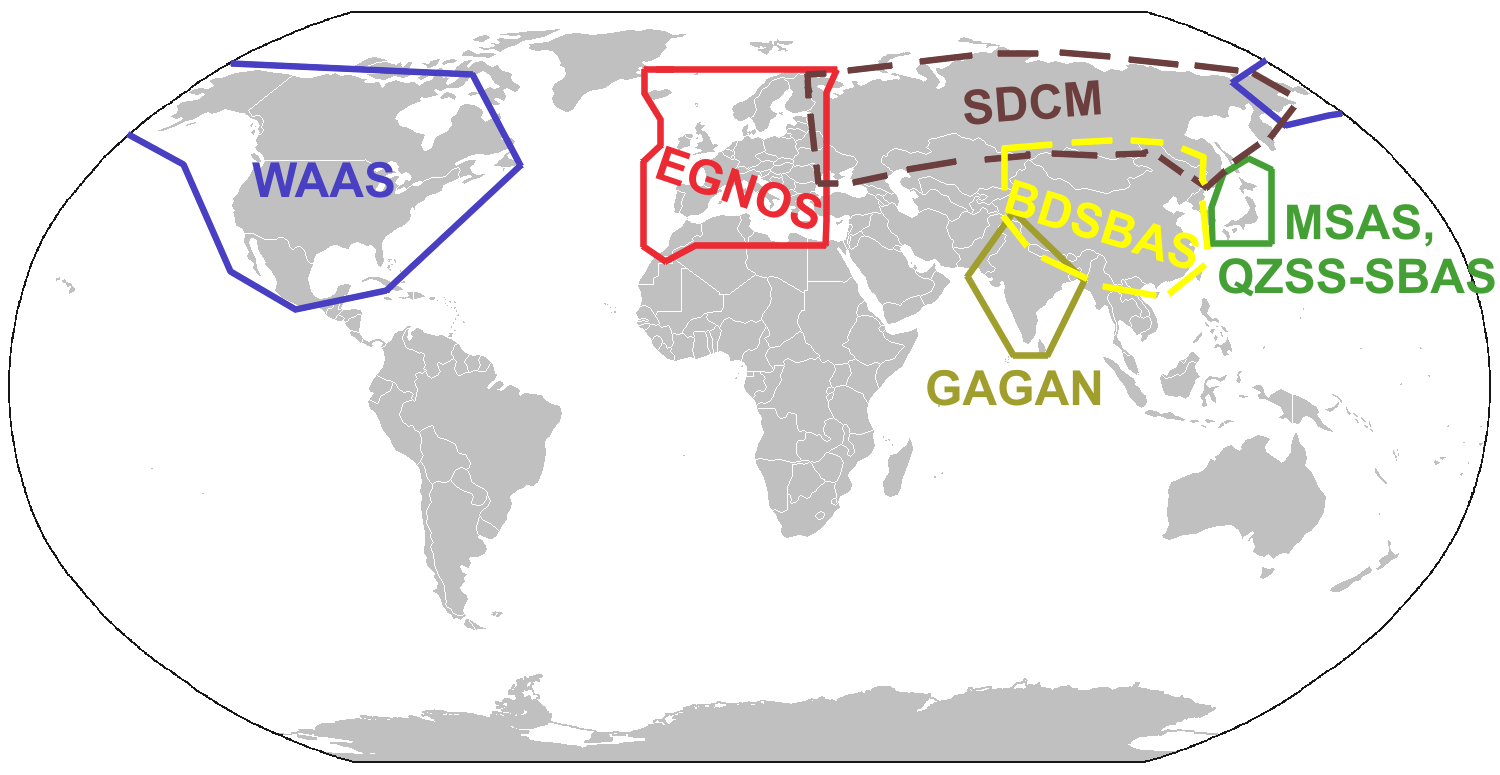
SBAS Service Areas

== WAAS objectives ==
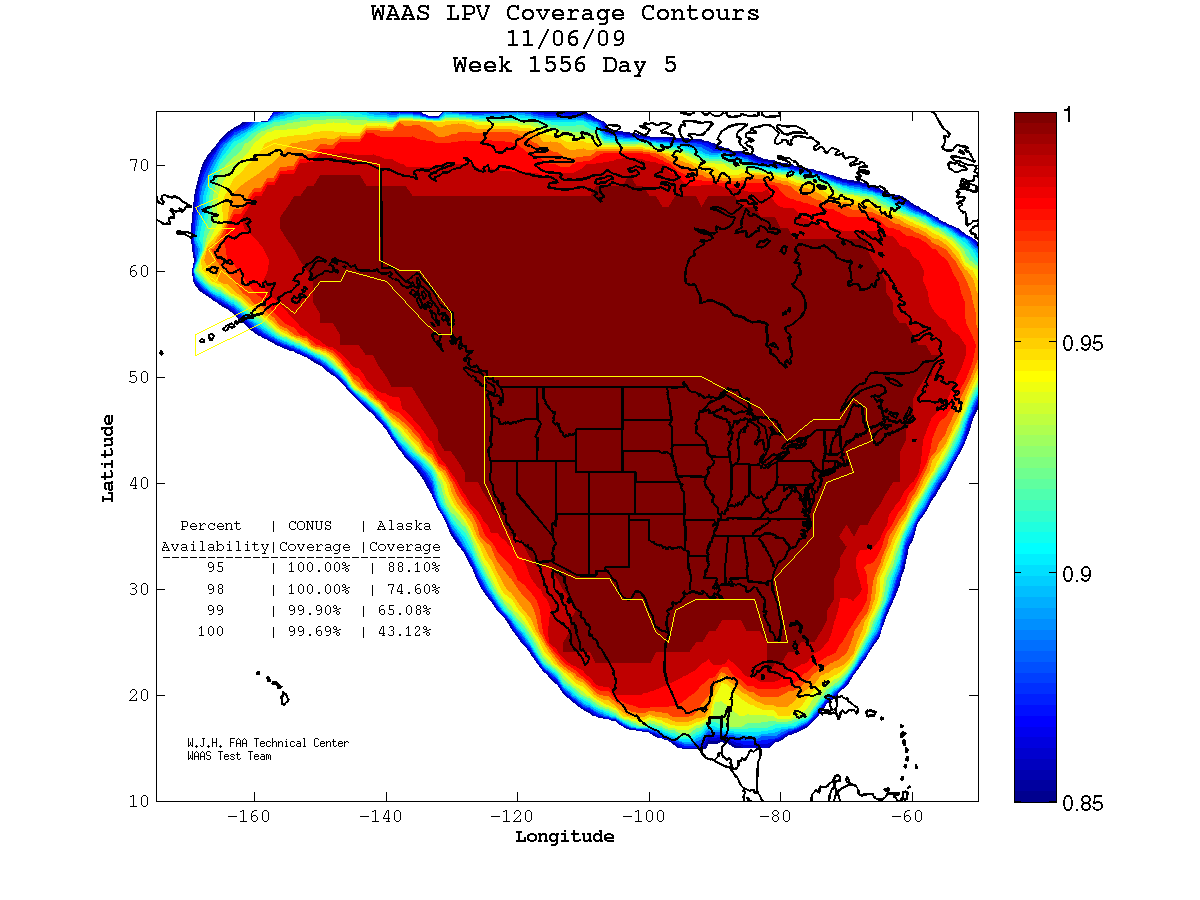
Typical WAAS service area. Dark red indicates best WAAS coverage. The service contours change over time with satellite geometry and ionospheric conditions.

=== Accuracy ===
A primary goal of WAAS was to allow aircraft to make a Category I approach without any equipment being installed at the airport. This would allow new GPS-based instrument landing approaches to be developed for any airport, even ones without any ground equipment. A Category I approach requires an accuracy of 16 metres (52 ft) laterally and 4.0 metres (13.1 ft) vertically.

FAA fact sheets and guidance on WAAS note that it enables thousands of instrument approach procedures in the United States, including LPV and LP procedures, and is often used to provide vertically guided minima comparable in concept (though not identical in standards) to precision-approach operations at airports without an ILS.

To meet this goal, the WAAS specification requires it to provide a position accuracy of 7.6 metres (25 ft) or less (for both lateral and vertical measurements), at least 95% of the time. Actual performance measurements of the system at specific locations have shown it typically provides better than 1.0 metre (3 ft 3 in) laterally and 1.5 metres (4 ft 11 in) vertically throughout most of the contiguous United States and large parts of Canada and Alaska.

=== Integrity ===
Integrity of a navigation system includes the ability to provide timely warnings when its signal is providing misleading data that could potentially create hazards. The WAAS specification requires the system detect errors in the GPS or WAAS network and notify users within 6.2 seconds. Certifying that WAAS is safe for instrument flight rules (IFR) (i.e. flying in the clouds) requires proving there is only an extremely small probability that an error exceeding the requirements for accuracy will go undetected. Specifically, the probability is stated as 1×10^{−7}, and is equivalent to no more than 3 seconds of bad data per year. This provides integrity information equivalent to or better than receiver autonomous integrity monitoring (RAIM).

=== Availability ===
Availability is the probability that a navigation system meets the accuracy and integrity requirements. Before the advent of WAAS, GPS specifications allowed for system unavailability for as much as a total time of four days per year (99% availability). The WAAS specification mandates availability as 99.999% (five nines) throughout the service area, equivalent to a downtime of just over 5 minutes per year.

== Operation ==
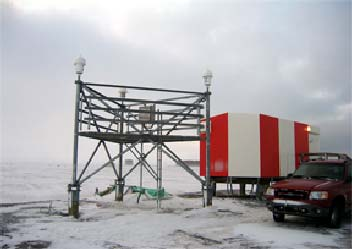
WAAS reference station in Utqiagvik, Alaska

WAAS is composed of three main segments: the ground segment, space segment, and user segment.

=== Ground segment ===
The ground segment is composed of multiple wide-area reference stations (WRS). These precisely surveyed ground stations monitor and collect information on the GPS signals, then send their data to three wide-area master stations (WMS) using a terrestrial communications network. The reference stations also monitor signals from WAAS geostationary satellites, providing integrity information regarding them as well. As of October 2007 there were 38 WRSs: twenty in the contiguous United States (CONUS), seven in Alaska, one in Hawaii, one in Puerto Rico, five in Mexico, and four in Canada.

Using the data from the WRS sites, the WMSs generate two different sets of corrections: fast and slow. The fast corrections are for errors which are changing rapidly and primarily concern the GPS satellites' instantaneous positions and clock errors. These corrections are considered user position-independent, which means they can be applied instantly by any receiver inside the WAAS broadcast footprint. The slow corrections include long-term ephemeric and clock error estimates, as well as ionospheric delay information. WAAS supplies delay corrections for a number of points (organized in a grid pattern) across the WAAS service area (see user segment below to understand how these corrections are used).

Once these correction messages are generated, the WMSs send them to two pairs of ground uplink stations (GUS), which then transmit to satellites in the space segment for rebroadcast to the user segment.

==== Reference stations ====
Each Air Route Traffic Control Center in the contiguous United States has a WAAS reference station, with the exception of Indianapolis Air Route Traffic Control Center. There are also stations positioned in Alaska, Canada, Mexico and Puerto Rico. See List of WAAS reference stations for the coordinates of the individual receiving antennas.

=== Space segment ===
The space segment consists of multiple communication satellites which broadcast the correction messages generated by the WAAS master stations for reception by the user segment. The satellites also broadcast the same type of range information as normal GPS satellites, effectively increasing the number of satellites available for a position fix. The space segment currently consists of three commercial satellites: Eutelsat 117 West B, SES-15, and Galaxy 30.

==== Satellite history ====
The original two WAAS satellites, named Pacific Ocean Region (POR) and Atlantic Ocean Region-West (AOR-W), were leased space on Inmarsat III satellites. These satellites ceased WAAS transmissions on July 31, 2007. With the end of the Inmarsat lease approaching, two new satellites (Galaxy 15 and Anik F1R) were launched in late 2005. Galaxy 15 is a PanAmSat and Anik F1R is a Telesat. As with the previous satellites, these are leased services under the FAA's Geostationary Satellite Communications Control Segment contract with Lockheed Martin for WAAS geostationary satellite leased services, who were contracted to provide up to three satellites through the year 2016.

A third satellite was later added to the system. From March to November 2010, the FAA broadcast a WAAS test signal on a leased transponder on the Inmarsat-4 F3 satellite. The test signal was not usable for navigation, but could be received and was reported with the identification numbers PRN 133 (NMEA #46). In November 2010, the signal was certified as operational and made available for navigation. Following in orbit testing, Eutelsat 117 West B, broadcasting signal on PRN 131 (NMEA #44), was certified as operational and made available for navigation on March 27, 2018. The SES 15 satellite was launched on May 18, 2017, and following an in-orbit test of several months, was set operational on July 15, 2019. In 2018, a contract was awarded to place a WAAS L-band payload on the Galaxy 30 satellite. The satellite was successfully launched on August 15, 2020, and the WAAS transmissions were set operational on April 26, 2022, re-using PRN 135 (NMEA #48). After approximately three weeks with four active WAAS satellites, operational WAAS transmissions on Anik F1-R were ended on May 17, 2022.

Satellite name and details	PRN	NMEA	Designator	Location	Active period (not in test mode)	Status	Signal capability
Atlantic Ocean Region-West	122	35	AORW	54°W, later moved to 142°W	July 10, 2003 – July 31, 2017	Ceased operational WAAS transmissions on July 31, 2017	L1 narrowband
Pacific Ocean Region (POR)	134	47	POR	178°E	July 10, 2003 – July 31, 2017	Ceased operational WAAS transmissions on July 31, 2017	L1
Galaxy 15	135	48	CRW	133°W	November 2006 – July 25, 2019	Ceased operational WAAS transmissions on July 25, 2019.	L1, L5 (test mode)
Anik F1R	138	51	CRE	107.3°W	July 2007 – May 17, 2022	Ceased operational WAAS transmissions on May 17, 2022.	L1, L5 (test mode)
Inmarsat-4 F3	133	46	AMR	98°W	November 2010 – November 9, 2017	Ceased operational WAAS transmissions as of November 9, 2017.	L1 narrowband, L5 (test mode)
Eutelsat 117 West B	131	44	SM9	117°W	March 2018 – present	Operational	L1, L5 (test mode)
SES 15	133	46	S15	129°W	July 15, 2019 – present	Operational	L1, L5 (test mode)
Galaxy 30	135	48	G30	125°W	April 26, 2022 – present	Operational	L1, L5 (test mode)

In the table above, PRN is the satellite's actual pseudo-random number code. NMEA is the satellite number sent by some receivers when outputting satellite information (NMEA = PRN - 87).

=== User segment ===
The user segment is the GPS and WAAS receiver, which uses the information broadcast from each GPS satellite to determine its location and the current time, and receives the WAAS corrections from the Space segment. The two types of correction messages received (fast and slow) are used in different ways.

The GPS receiver can immediately apply the fast type of correction data, which includes the corrected satellite position and clock data, and determines its current location using normal GPS calculations. Once an approximate position fix is obtained the receiver begins to use the slow corrections to improve its accuracy. Among the slow correction data is the ionospheric delay. As the GPS signal travels from the satellite to the receiver, it passes through the ionosphere. The receiver calculates the location where the signal pierced the ionosphere and, if it has received an ionospheric delay value for that location, corrects for the error the ionosphere created.

While the slow data can be updated every minute if necessary, ephemeris errors and ionosphere errors do not change this frequently, so they are only updated every two minutes and are considered valid for up to six minutes.

== History and development ==
The WAAS was jointly developed by the United States Department of Transportation (DOT) and the Federal Aviation Administration (FAA) as part of the Federal Radionavigation Program (DOT-VNTSC-RSPA-95-1/DOD-4650.5), beginning in 1994, to provide performance comparable to category 1 instrument landing system (ILS) for all aircraft possessing the appropriately certified equipment. Without WAAS, ionospheric disturbances, clock drift, and satellite orbit errors create too much error and uncertainty in the GPS signal to meet the requirements for a precision approach (see GPS sources of error). A precision approach includes altitude information and provides course guidance, distance from the runway, and elevation information at all points along the approach, usually down to lower altitudes and weather minimums than non-precision approaches.

Prior to the WAAS, the U.S. National Airspace System (NAS) did not have the ability to provide lateral and vertical navigation for precision approaches for all users at all locations. The traditional system for precision approaches is the instrument landing system (ILS), which used a series of radio transmitters each broadcasting a single signal to the aircraft. This complex series of radios needs to be installed at every runway end, some offsite, along a line extended from the runway centerline, making the implementation of a precision approach both difficult and very expensive. The ILS system is composed of 180 different transmitting antennas at each point built.

For some time the FAA and NASA developed a much improved system, the microwave landing system (MLS). The entire MLS system for a particular approach was isolated in one or two boxes located beside the runway, dramatically reducing the cost of implementation. MLS also offered a number of practical advantages that eased traffic considerations, both for aircraft and radio channels. Unfortunately, MLS would also require every airport and aircraft to upgrade their equipment.

During the development of MLS, consumer GPS receivers of various quality started appearing. GPS offered a huge number of advantages to the pilot, combining all of an aircraft's long-distance navigation systems into a single easy-to-use system, often small enough to be hand held. Deploying an aircraft navigation system based on GPS was largely a problem of developing new techniques and standards, as opposed to new equipment. The FAA started planning to shut down their existing long-distance systems (VOR and NDBs) in favor of GPS. This left the problem of approaches, however. GPS is simply not accurate enough to replace ILS systems. Typical accuracy is about 15 metres (49 ft), whereas even a "CAT I" approach, the least demanding, requires a vertical accuracy of 4 metres (13 ft).

This inaccuracy in GPS is mostly due to large "billows" in the ionosphere, which slow the radio signal from the satellites by a random amount. Since GPS relies on timing the signals to measure distances, this slowing of the signal makes the satellite appear farther away. The billows move slowly, and can be characterized using a variety of methods from the ground, or by examining the GPS signals themselves. By broadcasting this information to GPS receivers every minute or so, this source of error can be significantly reduced. This led to the concept of Differential GPS, which used separate radio systems to broadcast the correction signal to receivers. Aircraft could then install a receiver which would be plugged into the GPS unit, the signal being broadcast on a variety of frequencies for different users (FM radio for cars, longwave for ships, etc.). Broadcasters of the required power generally cluster around larger cities, making such DGPS systems less useful for wide-area navigation. Additionally, most radio signals are either line-of-sight, or can be distorted by the ground, which made DGPS difficult to use as a precision approach system or when flying low for other reasons.

The FAA considered systems that could allow the same correction signals to be broadcast over a much wider area, such as from a satellite, leading directly to WAAS. Since a GPS unit already consists of a satellite receiver, it made much more sense to send out the correction signals on the same frequencies used by GPS units, than to use an entirely separate system and thereby double the probability of failure. In addition to lowering implementation costs by "piggybacking" on a planned satellite launch, this also allowed the signal to be broadcast from geostationary orbit, which meant a small number of satellites could cover all of North America.

On July 10, 2003, the WAAS signal was activated for general aviation, covering 95% of the United States, and portions of Alaska offering 350 feet (110 m) minimums.

On January 17, 2008, Alabama-based Hickok & Associates became the first designer of helicopter WAAS with Localizer Performance (LP) and Localizer Performance with Vertical guidance (LPV) approaches, and the only entity with FAA-approved criteria (which even FAA has yet to develop). This helicopter WAAS criteria offers as low as 250 foot minimums and decreased visibility requirements to enable missions previously not possible. On April 1, 2009, FAA AFS-400 approved the first three helicopter WAAS GPS approach procedures for Hickok & Associates' customer California Shock/Trauma Air Rescue (CALSTAR). Since then they have designed many approved WAAS helicopter approaches for various EMS hospitals and air providers, within the United States as well as in other countries and continents.

On December 30, 2009, Seattle-based Horizon Air flew the first scheduled-passenger service flight using WAAS with LPV on flight 2014, a Portland to Seattle flight operated by a Bombardier Q400 with a WAAS FMS from Universal Avionics. The airline, in partnership with the FAA, will outfit seven Q400-aircraft with WAAS and share flight data to better determine the suitability of WAAS in scheduled air service applications.

=== Timeline ===
Wide-Area Augmentation System (WAAS) timeline

== Comparison of accuracy ==
A comparison of various radionavigation system accuracies
System	95% accuracy (lateral / vertical)	Details
LORAN-C specification	460 m / 460 m	The specified absolute accuracy of the LORAN-C system.
Distance measuring equipment (DME) specification	185 m (Linear)	DME is a radionavigation aid that can calculate the linear distance from an aircraft to ground equipment.
GPS specification	100 m / 150 m	The specified accuracy of the GPS system with the Selective Availability (SA) option turned on. SA was employed by the U.S. Government until May 1, 2000.
LORAN-C measured repeatability	50 m / 50 m	The U.S. Coast Guard reports "return to position" accuracies of 50 meters in time difference mode.
eLORAN repeatability		Modern LORAN-C receivers, which use all the available signals simultaneously and H-field antennas.
Differential GPS (DGPS)	10 m / 10 m	This is the Differential GPS (DGPS) worst-case accuracy. According to the 2001 Federal Radionavigation Systems (FRS) report published jointly by the U.S. DOT and Department of Defense (DoD), accuracy degrades with distance from the facility; it can be < 1 m but will normally be < 10 m.
Wide-area augmentation system (WAAS) specification	7.6 m / 7.6 m	The worst-case accuracy that the WAAS must provide to be used in precision approaches.
GPS measured	2.5 m / 4.7 m	The actual measured accuracy of the system (excluding receiver errors), with SA turned off, based on the findings of the FAA's National Satellite Test Bed, or NSTB.
WAAS measured	0.9 m / 1.3 m	The actual measured accuracy of the system (excluding receiver errors), based on the NSTB's findings.
Local-area augmentation system (LAAS) specification		The goal of the LAAS program is to provide Category IIIC ILS capability. This will allow aircraft to land with zero visibility utilizing 'autoland' systems and will indicate a very high accuracy of < 1 m.

== Benefits ==
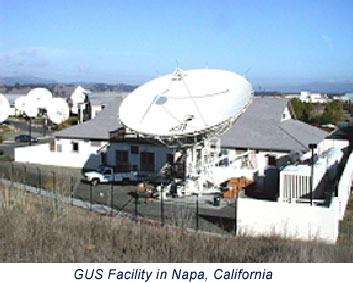
WAAS ground uplink station (GUS) in Napa, California

WAAS addresses all of the "navigation problem", providing highly accurate positioning that is extremely easy to use, for the cost of a single receiver installed on the aircraft. Ground- and space-based infrastructure is relatively limited, and no on-airport system is needed. WAAS allows a precision approach to be published for any airport, for the cost of developing the procedures and publishing the new approach plates. This means that almost any airport can have a precision approach and the cost of implementation is drastically reduced.

Additionally WAAS works just as well between airports. This allows the aircraft to fly directly from one airport to another, as opposed to following routes based on ground-based signals. This can cut route distances considerably in some cases, saving both time and fuel. In addition, because of its ability to provide information on the accuracy of each GPS satellite's information, aircraft equipped with WAAS are permitted to fly at lower en-route altitudes than was possible with ground-based systems, which were often blocked by terrain of varying elevation. This enables pilots to safely fly at lower altitudes, not having to rely on ground-based systems. For unpressurized aircraft, this conserves oxygen and enhances safety.

The above benefits create not only convenience, but also have the potential to generate significant cost savings. The cost to provide the WAAS signal, serving all 5,400 public use airports, is just under US$50 million per year. In comparison, the current ground based systems such as the Instrument Landing System (ILS), installed at only 600 airports, cost US$82 million in annual maintenance. Without ground navigation hardware to purchase, the total cost of publishing a runway's WAAS approach is approximately US$50,000; compared to the $1,000,000 to $1,500,000 cost to install an ILS radio system.

== Drawbacks and limitations ==
For all its benefits, WAAS is not without drawbacks and critical limitations:

- Space weather. All man-made satellite systems are subject to space weather and space debris threats. For example, a solar super-storm event composed of an extremely large and fast earthbound coronal mass ejection (CME) could disable the geosynchronous or GPS satellite elements of WAAS.
- The broadcasting satellites are geostationary, which causes them to be less than 10° above the horizon for locations north of 71.4° latitude. This means aircraft in areas of Alaska or northern Canada may have difficulty maintaining a lock on the WAAS signal.
- To calculate an ionospheric grid point's delay, that point must be located between a satellite and a reference station. The low number of satellites and ground stations limit the number of points which can be calculated.
- Aircraft conducting WAAS approaches use certified GPS receivers, which are much more expensive than non-certified units. In 2024, Garmin's least expensive certified receiver, the GPS 175, had a suggested retail price of US$5,895.
- WAAS is not capable of the accuracies required for Category II or III ILS approaches. Thus, WAAS is not a sole-solution and either existing ILS equipment must be maintained or it must be replaced by new systems, such as the local-area augmentation system (LAAS).
- WAAS Localizer Performance with Vertical guidance (LPV) approaches with 200-foot minimums (LPV-200) will not be published for airports without medium intensity lighting, precision runway markings and a parallel taxiway. Smaller airports, which currently may not have these features, would have to upgrade their facilities or require pilots to use higher minimums.
- As precision increases and error approaches zero, the navigation paradox states that there is an increased collision risk, as the likelihood of two craft occupying the same space on the shortest distance line between two navigational points has increased.

== Future of WAAS ==
=== Improvement to aviation operations ===
In 2007, WAAS vertical guidance was projected to be available nearly all the time (greater than 99%), and its coverage encompasses the full continental U.S., most of Alaska, northern Mexico, and southern Canada. At that time, the accuracy of WAAS would meet or exceed the requirements for Category 1 ILS approaches, namely, three-dimensional position information down to 200 feet (60 m) above touchdown zone elevation.

=== Software improvements ===
Software improvements, to be implemented by September 2008, significantly improve signal availability of vertical guidance throughout the CONUS and Alaska. Area covered by the 95% available LPV solution in Alaska improves from 62% to 86%. And in the CONUS, the 100% availability LPV-200 coverage rises from 48% to 84%, with 100% coverage of the LPV solution.

=== Space segment upgrades ===
Both Galaxy XV (PRN #135) and Anik F1R (PRN #138) contain an L1 & L5 GPS payload. This means they will potentially be usable with the L5 modernized GPS signals when the new signals and receivers become available. With L5, avionics will be able to use a combination of signals to provide the most accurate service possible, thereby increasing availability of the service. These avionics systems will use ionospheric corrections broadcast by WAAS, or self-generated onboard dual frequency corrections, depending on which one is more accurate.

== See also ==
- Satellite-based augmentation system (SBAS)
- EGNOS—the European operational SBAS
- MSAS—the Japanese operational SBAS
- CDGPS Canadian differential GPS
- Local-area augmentation system (LAAS)
- Joint Precision Approach and Landing System (JPALS)
- Distance measuring equipment (DME)
- Instrument flight rules (IFR)
- Instrument landing system (ILS)
- Localizer performance with vertical guidance (LPV)
- Long-range radio navigation (LORAN)
- Microwave landing system (MLS)
- Non-directional beacon (NDB)
- Tactical air navigation system (TACAN)
- Transponder landing system (TLS)
- VHF omnidirectional range (VOR)
