= SkyBitz =

SkyBitz, Inc.
- Type: Subsidiary
- Industry: Telecommunications, Asset tracking
- Founded: Sterling, Virginia, United States (1993)
- Headquarters: Herndon, Virginia, United States
- Key people: Henry Popplewell, Senior Vice President and General Manager
- Parent: Telular Inc.

SkyBitz is an American company based in Herndon, Virginia, that provides machine to machine (M2M) products for the tracking and management of mobile assets. Parent company Telular Corporation is a fully owned subsidiary of Avista Capital Partners, a private equity firm based in the United States. SkyBitz is a remote asset tracking and information management service provider, specializing in real-time decision-making tools for companies with unpowered assets such as tractor-trailers, intermodal containers, chassis, rail cars, power generators, heavy equipment, and other assets. The company's asset tracking products are delivered using a software as a service (SaaS) model to commercial, transportation, military, and public safety customers, including sensitive shipment haulers of Arms, Ammunition, and Explosives (AA&E) cargos. With the acquisition of commercial telematics companies Reltima and GPS North America in 2015, SkyBitz entered the local fleet management market.

== Overview ==
SkyBitz was founded in 1993 in the Washington, D.C., metropolitan area under the name Eagle Eye Technologies, Inc. and used both DARPA and the United States Air Force SBIR funding to develop its patented Global Locating System (GLS). GLS technology differs from traditional Global Positioning System (GPS) technology in that positioning calculations are done centrally and automatically at an operations center instead of locally on each device. In early 2002, the company—now called SkyBitz—announced the commercial launch of its GLS technology.

By 2007 SkyBitz had acquired more than 400 customers in North America and added two new products to its existing suite. It was ranked in Inc. 5000 for the first time that year, as well as in numerous Fast 500 programs from Deloitte Touche Tohmatsu Limited.

By 2012 SkyBitz had captured the interest of Telular Corporation, a global leader in connecting businesses and machines over wireless networks. The acquisition of SkyBitz by Telular for a total of $42 million was announced in December 2012. Less than a year later, private equity firm Avista Capital Partners completed its acquisition of Telular for a 31 percent premium to its stock market price. SkyBitz operates as a wholly owned subsidiary of Telular and remains headquartered in the Washington, D.C., metropolitan area.

Today SkyBitz continues to utilize its GLS technology and also offers a variety of other asset tracking solutions based on a portfolio of GPS units and sensors. They operate over many communications networks, ranging from Low Earth orbit and geostationary satellite systems to GSM/GPRS networks. In 2014 SkyBitz won two awards from M2M Evolution Magazine for its GPS-operating asset management product—the M2M Product of the Year Award for Exceptional Innovation and the M2M Evolution Asset Tracking Award.

In 2014 SkyBitz also began offering a subscription service, which amortizes all of the costs into one monthly recurring fee.

== History ==
=== Research and development ===
In 1992 Matthew Schor started the company as Eagle Eye Location Services Corp. The firm was awarded its first SBIR contract from DARPA in July 1994 titled "Miniature, Affordable Satellite Beacon". In November 1995 the company changed its name to Eagle Eye Technologies, Inc., and the Defense Advanced Research Projects Agency (DARPA) awarded Eagle Eye a $500,000 contract to miniaturize the RF front end of the satellite tag transceiver. In 1997 the Virginia Center for Innovative Technology provided a research grant that allowed Eagle Eye to work with professor Warren Stutzman at Virginia Tech in Blacksburg, Virginia to further develop their technology.

In 1998 the United States Air Force awarded Eagle Eye the first of another two contracts to miniaturize the tracking system and reduce its power consumption. The company's chief scientist, Mark Sullivan, as well as the vice president, James Kilfeather, received patents on technologies used by SkyBitz. The company's chief technical officer, Jay Brosius, led the design effort for the communications protocol (Slotted Aloha) and architecture.

In October 1998 World Wireless Communications of Utah announced an agreement to produce a prototype mobile terminal employing Global Locating System (GLS) for asset location. Eagle Eye was able to demonstrate the GLS technology via the MSAT geostationary satellite built by Hughes Space and Electronics (now owned by Boeing). In July 2000, Zero Gravity Venture Partners invested in a Series A venture capital round. Raising capital at this time could not have been more fortuitous for SkyBitz, because the unforeseen events of 9/11 made raising capital even more difficult. It took an extended year to close the next round of financing and bring the product and service to market. The dedication of the entire team culminated in the pre-production manufacturing of the product with Solectron, development of the web-based service, and field testing with early key accounts. Landstar had tested 500 units and found that SkyBitz met their requirements. These efforts ultimately attracted new investors to set the stage for market introduction in 2002.

=== Commercial launch ===
In early 2002, the company hired Michael Fitzgerald as CEO. Michael Fitzgerald had a stellar career in the trucking industry including one of the original management team at Federal Express. The company subsequently announced the launch of the GLS technology. In November 2002, AIG Highstar Capital and Cordova Ventures led an $18 million Series B investment. Helen Bentley Delich via Helen Bentley & Associates received $34,000 to assist and advise SkyBitz as it commercially launched into the trucking and transportation industry. Landstar System, one of the largest transportation firms in the U.S., adopted the service in January 2003.

In early 2003, SkyBitz announced its existing manufacturing relationship with Solectron, which included new product introduction (NPI), test development, printed circuit board layout and design, card assembly and design of the external housing for SkyBitz's mobile terminal. Soon after, the company received a $1 million grant from the Transportation Security Administration for implementing GLS at the Port of Long Beach by the Maritime Administration. To support this trial, Matthew Schor was interviewed on MSNBC in February 2003 on how U.S. ports were vulnerable to attack and how technology could help. In May 2003 it was announced that the Defense Threat Reduction Agency issued a contract to Eagle Eye Technologies, Inc. for communication studies in support of its mission.

In early 2003 the company hired Andy Wood as CEO to replace Fitzgerald. In January 2004, Inverness Capital and Motorola made a $16 million Series C investment in SkyBitz. In April 2004, Andy Wood resigned as CEO and the company's CFO, Rick Burtner, became CEO. In 2005, SkyBitz acquired customers in the transportation industry including R&R Trucking, Tri-State Motor, Quality Distribution and J Rayl. The company was also selected as a "2005 Future 50" technology company by SmartCEO Magazine for its strategic direction and customer growth. In 2006, SkyBitz announced smart sensor tracking technology to optimize trailer utilization, improve reporting and maximize security. The company was named a “Rising Star” in Deloitte & Touche USA LLP's Technology Fast 50 program for the state of Virginia. SkyBitz also became the official tracking solution for the delivery of the United States Capitol Christmas Tree. In the same year, Bob Blair joined the company as CFO.

In February 2007, the Canadian Imperial Bank of Commerce (via CIBC Capital Partners) led the fourth round of funding totaling $10 million. In October 2007, Homaira Akbari replaced Burtner as CEO. By the end of 2007 SkyBitz had acquired more than 400 customers in North America and added two new products: a cargo sensor and tractor/trailer ID. The company was also ranked in Inc. 500, the Deloitte Wireless Fast 50, Deloitte Technology Fast 500, The Deloitte Technology Fast 50 for the states of Virginia and Maryland, and the Heavy Duty Trucking Nifty Fifty Award.

=== Expansion ===
In January 2009, SkyBitz and research firm CSMG, the strategy division of TMNG Global, announced new research quantifying the benefits of remote asset management. Then in April 2009, SkyBitz expanded its sales coverage into Canada with a partnership with ELM Technologies. Also in April, a case study was released by the Defense Advanced Research Projects Agency (DARPA) highlighting SkyBitz technology.

Later in 2009 the company launched a new terrestrial-based tracking solution on Kore Networks, announced it received Defense Transportation Tracking System II (DTTS) certification by the Military Surface Deployment and Distribution Command (SDDC), and launched a new asset tracking software for trailer leasing companies. In 2010, SkyBitz announced a strategic partnership with Iridium Communications Inc. By 2012 SkyBitz had launched a new Iridium-based global solution.

This quick expansion phase resulted in SkyBitz being named to Inc. 5000 for five consecutive years from 2007 to 2011. It also drew the attention of Telular Corporation, an American company that utilizes wireless technology to provide security alarm systems and liquid tank level monitoring. Telular, under CEO Joseph Beatty, acquired SkyBitz in December 2012 for a purchase price of $42 million ($35 million cash and $7 million newly issued shares of common stock). The acquisition increased the size of Telular by about 70 percent and created the largest "pure player" asset tracking and management company in the world. Former Senior Vice President of Sales Henry Popplewell was named Senior Vice President and General Manager of SkyBitz. In 2013 Telular was sold to private equity firm Avista Capital Partners through a tender offer for all outstanding shares of Telular stock at a 31 percent premium. Beatty stepped down as CEO in conjunction with the deal. Doug Milner was named CEO of Telular Corporation in August 2013.

Also in 2013, SkyBitz launched a new custom-built cellular product that would win two awards from M2M Evolution magazine—the M2M Product of the Year Award for Exceptional Innovation and the M2M Evolution Asset Tracking Award. In 2014 SkyBitz introduced a new purchase option that eliminated initial capital expenses for hardware. Traditionally, technology products and services in the transportation and logistics industry are sold with the initial capital expense and a monthly service fee. The new SkyBitz offering is a subscription-based solution that requires only a monthly fee, representing a shift in purchasing style in the industry. U.S. Xpress Enterprises, Interstate Distributor, and Transport America were early adopters of the new SaaS-based business model.

In February 2015, SkyBitz announced a partnership with Pressure Systems International, Inc. (PSI), the "world leader in automatic tire inflation systems". Through the collaboration, joint customers gained the ability to view tire status and trailer location together in real-time. The partnership was aimed at reducing maintenance costs for fleets of trailers. Also in 2015, Telular acquired two companies that were integrated under the SkyBitz division. The acquisition of these two companies, GPS North America and Reltima, allowed SkyBitz to enter the local fleet management market.

In October 2017, SkyBitz's parent company Telular announced the partnership between SkyBitz and Velociti, a provider of "technology deployment services". The focus of the partnership is to provide North American customers with faster deployment times of SkyBitz's technologies across their fleets.

In April 2018, SkyBitz became a "NASPO approved technology vendor". This partnership allows SkyBitz to work with government contractors in all 50 states, the District of Columbia, and the organized United States territories.
