= GPS·C =

Canadian GNSS augmentation system

GPS·C (GPS Correction) was a Differential GPS data source for most of Canada maintained by the Canadian Active Control System, part of Natural Resources Canada. When used with an appropriate receiver, GPS·C improved real-time accuracy to about 1–2 meters, from a nominal 15 m accuracy.

Real-time data was collected at fourteen permanent ground stations spread across Canada, and forwarded to the central station, "NRC1", in Ottawa for processing.

Visiting the external webpage for this service on 2011-11-04, there is only a note saying that the service had been discontinued on 2011-04-01. There is a PDF link on that page to possible alternatives.

== CDGPS ==
GPS·C information was broadcast Canada-wide on MSAT by the Canada-Wide DGPS Correction Service (CDGPS). CDGPS required a separate MSAT receiver, which output correction information in the RTCM format for input into any suitably equipped GPS receiver. The need for a separate receiver made it less cost-effective than solutions like WAAS or StarFire, which receive their correction information using the same antenna and receiver.

CDGPS Reference Stations
Station name	Location	Operational Date	Coordinates
ALBH	Canadian Forces Base, Esquimalt, British Columbia (near Victoria, British Columbia)	1 May 1992	48°23′23.2″N 123°29′14.8″W
ALGO	Algonquin Space Complex, Algonquin Provincial Park, Ontario	1 January 1991	45°57′20.8″N 78°4′16.9″W
CHUR	Geological Survey of Canada regional seismic station, Churchill, Manitoba	1 April 1993	58°45′32.6″N 94°5′19.4″W
DRAO	Dominion Radio Astrophysical Observatory, Penticton, British Columbia	1 February 1991	49°19′21.4″N 119°37′27.9″W
EUR2	New Environment Canada Weather Station building, Eureka, Nunavut	9 October 2005	79°59′20.2″N 85°56′15.2″W
FRDN	Hugh John Fleming Forestry Complex, near the University of New Brunswick in Fredericton, New Brunswick	1 February 2003	45°56′0.6″N 66°39′35.6″W
HLFX	Bedford Institute of Oceanography, Dartmouth, Nova Scotia	19 December 2001	44°41′0.7″N 63°36′40.6″W
NRC1	Institute for National Measurement Standards, National Research Centre, Ottawa, Ontario	1 April 1995	45°27′15.0″N 75°37′25.8″W
PRDS	Dominion Observatory in Priddis, Alberta (near Calgary, Alberta)	7 January 1997	50°52′16.8″N 114°17′36.5″W
SCH2	Transport Canada radio telecommunication facility, Schefferville, Quebec	29 June 1997	54°49′55.5″N 66°49′57.4″W
STJO	Geological Survey of Canada (NRCan) geomagnetic observing station, St. John's, Newfoundland	1 May 1992	47°35′42.8″N 52°40′39.9″W
WHIT	Whitehorse, Yukon	1 June 1996	60°45′01.8″N 135°13′19.5″W
WINN	NavCanada Winnipeg Area Control Centre building, Winnipeg, Manitoba	9 January 1997	49°54′02.1″N 97°15′34.1″W
YELL	Yellowknife, Northwest Territories	1 January 1991	62°28′51.2″N 114°28′50.4″W

== Shutdown ==
On April 9, 2010, it was announced that the service would be discontinued by March 31, 2011. The service was decommissioned on March 31, 2011 and finally terminated on April 1, 2011, at 9:00 EDT.
