= Microwave landing system =

All-weather, precision radio guidance system

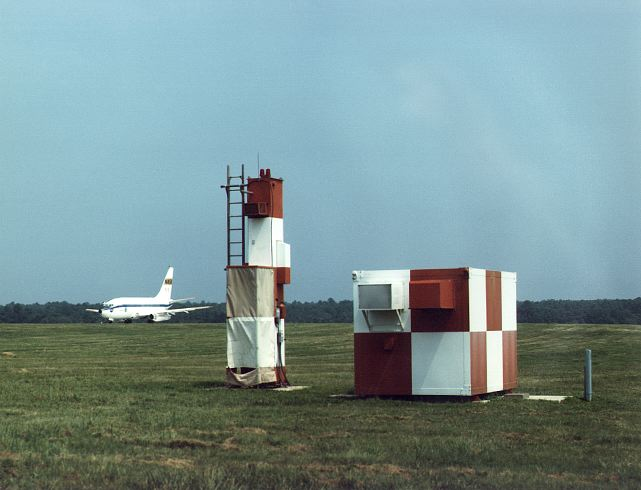
The NASA 737 research aircraft on the Wallops runway in 1987 with the microwave landing system equipment in the foreground

The microwave landing system (MLS) was an all-weather, precision radio guidance system intended to be installed at large airports to assist aircraft in landing, including 'blind landings'.ICAO Annex 10, Volume I, Chapter 3, Section 3.11 Microwave Landing Systems Characteristics (7 ed.). Montreal: International Civil Aviation Organisation. 2018. MLS enabled an approaching aircraft to determine when it was aligned with the destination runway and on the correct glidepath for a safe landing. MLS was intended to replace or supplement the instrument landing systems (ILS). MLS had a number of operational advantages over ILS, including a wider selection of channels to avoid interference with nearby installations, excellent performance in all weather, a small "footprint" at the airports, and wide vertical and horizontal "capture" angles that allowed approaches from wider areas around the airport.

Although some MLS systems became operational in the 1990s, the widespread deployment envisioned by some aviation agencies never became a reality. There were two reasons: (economic) while technically superior to ILS, MLS did not offer sufficiently greater capabilities to justify adding MLS receivers to aircraft equipage; and (potentially superior third system) GPS-based systems, notably WAAS, allowed the expectation of a similar level of positioning with no equipment needed at the airport. GPS/WAAS dramatically lowers an airport's cost of implementing approaches with vertical guidance, which is particularly important at small airports. For these reasons, all MLS systems in North America have been turned off. GPS/WAAS-based LPV 'Localizer Performance with Vertical guidance' approaches provide vertical guidance comparable to ILS Category I and FAA-published LPV approaches currently outnumber ILS approaches at US airports.

Though initially MLS appeared to be of interest in Europe, where concerns over the availability of GPS in Europe were an issue, widespread installation never occurred. Further deployment of the system never happened. Rather, several European airports have implemented LPV approaches based on the EGNOS (WAAS-compatible) satellite system.

== Principle ==
MLS employed 5 GHz transmitters at the landing place which used passive electronically scanned arrays to send scanning beams towards approaching aircraft. An aircraft that entered the scanned volume used a special receiver that calculated its position by measuring the arrival times of the beams.

== History ==
The US version of MLS, a joint development between the FAA, NASA, and the United States Department of Defense, was designed to provide precision navigation guidance for exact alignment and descent of aircraft on approach to a runway. It provided azimuth, elevation, and distance, as well as "back azimuth" for navigating away from an aborted landing or missed approach. MLS channels were also used for short-range communications with airport controllers, allowing long-distance frequencies to be handed over to other aircraft.

In Australia, design work commenced on a version of MLS in 1972. Most of this work was done jointly by the Federal Department of Civil Aviation (DCA), and the Radio Physics Division of the CSIRO. The project was called Interscan, one of several microwave landing systems under consideration internationally. Interscan was chosen by the FAA in 1975 and by the International Civil Aviation Organization in 1978 as the format to be adopted. An engineered version of the system, called MITAN, was developed by industry (AWA and Hawker de Havilland) under a contract with DCA's successor, the Department of Transport, and successfully demonstrated at Melbourne Airport in the late 1970s. The white antenna dishes could still be seen at Melbourne Airport until 2003 when they were dismantled.

This initial research was followed by the formation of Interscan International limited in Sydney, Australia in 1979 which manufactured MLS systems that were subsequently deployed in the US, EU, Taiwan, China and Australia. The Civil Aviation Authority (United Kingdom) developed a version of MLS, which is installed at Heathrow Airport and other airports, because of the greater incidence of instrument approaches with Cat II/III weather.

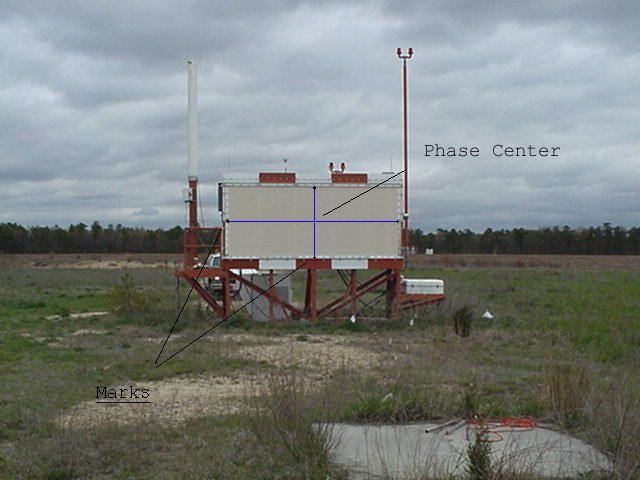
An MLS azimuth guidance station with rectangular azimuth scanning antenna with DME antenna at left

Compared with the existing instrument landing system (ILS), MLS had significant advantages. The antennas were much smaller, using a higher frequency signal. They also did not have to be placed at a specific location at the airport, and could "offset" their signals electronically. This made placement easier compared with the physically larger ILS systems, which had to be placed at the ends of the runways and along the approach path.

Another advantage was that the MLS signals covered a very wide fan-shaped area off the end of the runway, allowing controllers to direct aircraft approaching from a variety of directions or guide aircraft along a segmented approach. In comparison, ILS could only guide the aircraft down a single straight line, requiring controllers to distribute planes along that line. MLS allowed aircraft to approach from whatever direction they were already flying in, as opposed to flying to a parking orbit before "capturing" the ILS signal. This was particularly valuable at larger airports, as it could allow the aircraft to be separated horizontally much closer to the airport. Similarly in elevation, the fan shaped coverage allows for variations in descent rate, making MLS useful for aircraft with steeper approach angles such as helicopters, fighters and the space shuttle.

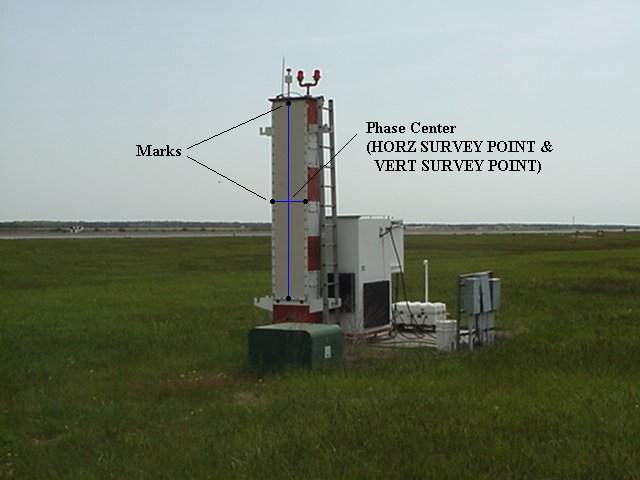
An MLS elevation guidance station

Unlike ILS, which required a variety of frequencies to broadcast the various signals, MLS used a single frequency, broadcasting the azimuth and altitude information one after the other. This reduced the chance of frequency conflicts, as did the fact that the frequencies used were far away from FM broadcasts, another problem with ILS. MLS also offered two hundred separate channels, making conflicts between airports in the same area easily preventable.

Finally, the accuracy was greatly improved over ILS. For instance, standard DME equipment used with ILS offered range accuracy of only ±1200 feet. MLS improved this to ±100 ft in what they referred to as DME/P (for precision), and offered similar improvements in azimuth and altitude. This allowed MLS to guide extremely accurate CAT III approaches, whereas this normally required an expensive ground-based high precision radar.

Similar to other precision landing systems, lateral and vertical guidance may be displayed on conventional course deviation indicators or incorporated into multipurpose cockpit displays. Range information can also be displayed by conventional DME indicators and also incorporated into multipurpose displays.

It was originally intended that ILS would remain in operation until 2010 before being replaced by MLS. The system was only being installed experimentally in the 1980s when the FAA began to favor GPS. Even in the worst cases, GPS offered at least 300 ft accuracy, not as good as MLS, but much better than ILS. GPS also worked "everywhere", not just off the end of the runways. This meant that a single navigation instrument could replace both short and long-range navigation systems, offer better accuracy than either, and required no ground-based equipment.

The performance of GPS, namely vertical guidance accuracy near the runway threshold and the integrity of the system have not been able to match historical ICAO standards and practices. Greater GPS accuracy could be provided by sending out "correcting signals" from ground-based stations, which would improve the accuracy to about 10 m in the worst case, far outperforming MLS. Initially it was planned to send these signals out over short-range FM transmissions on commercial radio frequencies, but this proved to be too difficult to arrange. Today a similar signal is instead sent across all of North America via commercial satellites, in a system known as WAAS. However WAAS is not capable of providing CAT II or CAT III standard signals for air carrier autoland and so a Local Area Augmentation System, or LAAS, must be used.

=== Space shuttle ===
The microwave scanning beam landing system (MSBLS) was a K_{u} band approach and landing navigation aid used by NASA's Space Shuttle. It provided precise elevation, directional and distance data which was used to guide the orbiter for the last two minutes of flight until touchdown. The signal was typically usable from a horizontal distance of approximately 28 km and from an altitude of approximately 5 km (18,000 feet).

MSBLS installations used by NASA were certified every two years for accuracy. From 2004, the Federal Aviation Administration worked with NASA to execute this verification. Previously, only NASA aircraft and equipment were used. Testing of the Kennedy Space Center's MSBLS in 2004 revealed an accuracy of 5 centimeters.

The Space Shuttle landing approach started with a glide slope of 19 degrees, which is over six times steeper than the typical 3-degree slope of commercial jet airliners.

== Operational functions ==
The system may be divided into five functions: Approach azimuth, Back azimuth, Approach elevation, Range and Data communications.

FIG 1-1-10: 3D representation of coverage volumes

=== Approach azimuth guidance ===
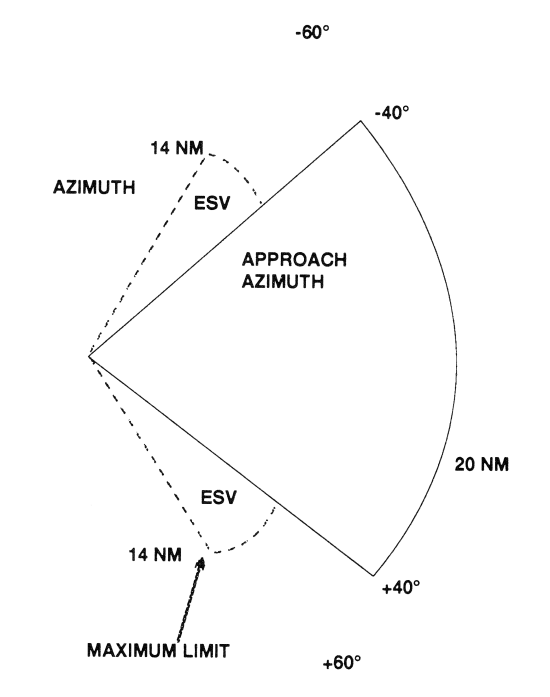
FIG 1-1-8: Coverage volume of the azimuth station

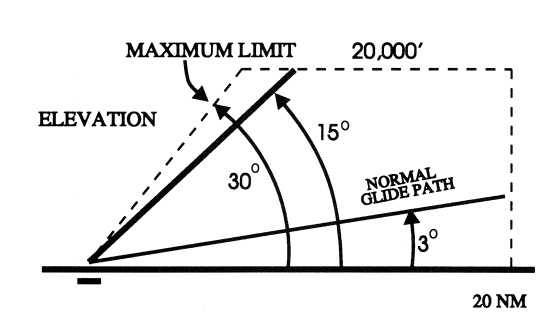
FIG 1-1-9: Coverage volumes of the elevation station

The azimuth station transmitted MLS angle and data on one of 200 channels within the frequency range of 5031 to 5090.7 MHz and is normally located about 1,000 feet (300 m) beyond the stop end of the runway, but there is considerable flexibility in selecting sites. For example, for heliport operations the azimuth transmitter can be collocated with the elevation transmitter.

The azimuth coverage extended: Laterally, at least 40 degrees on either side of the runway centerline in a standard configuration. In elevation, up to an angle of 15 degrees and to at least 20,000 feet (6 km), and in range, to at least 20 nautical miles (37 km) (See FIG 1-1-8.)

=== Elevation guidance ===
The elevation station transmitted signals on the same frequency as the azimuth station. A single frequency was time-shared between angle and data functions and was normally located about 400 feet from the side of the runway between runway threshold and the touchdown zone.

Elevation coverage was provided in the same airspace as the azimuth guidance signals: In elevation, to at least +15 degrees; Laterally, to fill the Azimuth lateral coverage and in range, to at least 20 nautical miles (37 km) (See FIG 1-1-9.)

=== Range guidance ===
The MLS Precision Distance Measuring Equipment (DME/P) functioned in the same way as the navigation DME, but there was some technical differences. The beacon transponder operates in the frequency band 962 to 1105 MHz and responds to an aircraft interrogator. The MLS DME/P accuracy is improved to be consistent with the accuracy provided by the MLS azimuth and elevation stations.

A DME/P channel was paired with the azimuth and elevation channel. A complete listing of the 200 paired channels of the DME/P with the angle functions is contained in FAA Standard 022 (MLS Interoperability and Performance Requirements).

The DME/N or DME/P was an integral part of the MLS and is installed at all MLS facilities unless a waiver is obtained. This occurred infrequently and only at outlying, low-density airports where marker beacons or compass locators are already in place.

=== Data communications ===
The data transmission could include both the basic and auxiliary data words. All MLS facilities transmit basic data. Where needed, auxiliary data could be transmitted. MLS data was transmitted throughout the azimuth (and back azimuth when provided) coverage sectors. Representative data include: Station identification, Exact locations of azimuth, elevation and DME/P stations (for MLS receiver processing functions), Ground equipment performance level; and DME/P channel and status.

MLS identification is a four-letter designation starting with the letter M. It is transmitted in International Morse Code at least six times per minute by the approach azimuth (and back azimuth) ground equipment.

Auxiliary data content: Representative data include: 3-D locations of MLS equipment, Waypoint coordinates, Runway conditions and Weather (e.g., RVR, ceiling, altimeter setting, wind, wake vortex, wind shear).

== Future ==
In the United States, the FAA suspended the MLS program in 1994 in favor of the GPS (Wide Area Augmentation System WAAS). The FAA's inventory of instrument flight procedures no longer includes any MLS locations; the last two were eliminated in 2008.

Due to different operational conditions in Europe many countries (particularly those known for low visibility conditions) were expected to embrace the MLS system as a replacement to ILS. However, in reality the only major installation was London Heathrow Airport, which was decommissioned on 31 May 2017. Other major airports, such as Frankfurt Airport which were expected to install MLS have instead installed ground-based augmentation system (GBAS) systems and published GBAS-based approach procedures.

As more GBAS system are installed, then the further installation of MLS or continued operation of existing systems must be in doubt.

== See also ==
- Local area augmentation system (LAAS)
- Tactical air navigation system (TACAN)
- Transponder landing system (TLS)
