= MSAT =

Canadian mobile telephony service

MSAT (Mobile Satellite) is a satellite-based mobile telephony service developed by the National Research Council Canada (NRC). Supported by a number of companies in the US and Canada, MSAT hosts a number of services, including the broadcast of CDGPS signals. The MSAT satellites were built by Hughes (now owned by Boeing) with a 3 kilowatt solar array power capacity and sufficient fuel for a design life of twelve years. TMI Communications of Canada referred to its MSAT satellite as MSAT-1, while American Mobile Satellite Consortium (now Ligado Networks) referred to its MSAT as AMSC-1, with each satellite providing backup for the other.

== History ==
- April 7, 1995 - MSAT-2 (a.k.a. AMSC-1, COSPAR 1995-019A, SATCAT 23553) launched from Cape Canaveral, Launch Complex 36, Pad A, aboard Atlas IIA
- May 1995 - testing causes overheating and damage to one of eight hybrid matrix amplifier output ports aboard MSAT-2
- April 20, 1996 - MSAT-1 (sometimes AMSC 2, COSPAR 1996-022A, SATCAT 23846) launched from Kourou, French Guiana aboard Ariane 42P
- May 15, 1996 - Reported failures of two solid state power amplifiers (SSPAs) and one L-band receiver on separate occasions aboard MSAT-2.
- May 4, 2003 - MSAT-1 loses two power amplifiers.

== Phaseout ==
MSAT-1 and MSAT-2 have had their share of problems. Mobile Satellite Ventures placed the AMSC-1 satellite into a 2.5 degree inclined orbit operations mode in November 2004, reducing station-keeping fuel usage and extending the satellite's useful life.

On January 11, 2006, Mobile Satellite Ventures (MSVLP) (changed name to SkyTerra, then became by acquisition LightSquared, then after bankruptcy Ligado Networks) announced plans to launch a new generation of satellites (in a 3 satellite configuration) to replace the MSAT satellites by 2010. MSV has said that all old MSAT gear would be compatible with the new satellites.

- MSV-1 (U.S.)
- MSV-2 (Canada)
- MSV-SA (South America)

== Services Delivered via MSAT ==
The following services are singularly dependent upon the continued operation of the MSAT satellite:

- CDGPS - a differential correction signal system for improved GPS navigation accuracy
- Trailer Tracking - by SkyWave Mobile Communications
- Trailer Tracking - by SkyBitz
- EMERGNET - by Glentel

== See also ==
- Mobile-satellite service
- Satellite phone
