= Galaxy 30 =

North American communications satellite

- Names: Galaxy 14R
- Mission type: Communications
- Operator: Intelsat
- COSPAR ID: 2020-056C
- SATCAT no.: 46114
- Website: https://www.intelsat.com
- Mission duration: 20 years (planned); 5 years, 4 months, 23 days (elapsed)

Spacecraft properties
- Spacecraft type: Galaxy
- Bus: GEOStar-2
- Manufacturer: Orbital ATK
- Launch mass: 3,298 kg (7,271 lb)
- Power: 16 kW

Start of mission
- Launch date: 15 August 2020, 22:04:00 UTC
- Rocket: Ariane 5 ECA (VA253)
- Launch site: Centre Spatial Guyanais, ELA-3
- Contractor: Arianespace

Orbital parameters
- Reference system: Geocentric orbit
- Regime: Geostationary orbit
- Slot: 125° West

Transponders
- Band: C-band; Ku-band; Ka-band; L-band
- Coverage area: North America

Galaxy 30 is a communications satellite owned by Intelsat located at 125° West longitude, serving the North American market. It was built by Orbital ATK, as part of its GEOStar-2 line. Galaxy 30 was formerly known as Galaxy 14R. This satellite provides services in the C-band, Ku-band, Ka-band, and L-band.

== History ==
Galaxy 30 was contracted in January 2018 by Intelsat to Orbital ATK.

== Launch ==
Galaxy 30 is an American (Bermuda registered) geostationary satellite that was launched by an Ariane 5 ECA launch vehicle from Centre Spatial Guyanais, Kourou, French Guiana at 22:04:00 UTC on 15 August 2020. The 3,298 kg (7,271 lb), 16 kW satellite carries C-band, Ku-band, and Ka-band transponders to provide data transmissions to North America, after parking over 125° West longitude. Galaxy 30 carries a C-band transponder payload for traditional broadcast applications, such as ultra-high definition television distribution, and also Ku-band and Ka-band payloads to support broadband applications. The satellite also hosts a Wide Area Augmentation System (WAAS-GEO 7) payload, transmitting in the L band (specifically, L1 and L5).
