= StarFire (navigation system) =

Differential GPS system

StarFire is a wide-area differential GPS developed by John Deere's NavCom and precision farming groups. StarFire broadcasts additional "correction information" over Inmarsat satellite's L-band frequencies around the world, allowing a StarFire-equipped receiver to produce position measurements accurate to well under one meter, with typical accuracy over a 24-hour period being under 4.5 cm. StarFire is similar to the FAA's differential GPS Wide Area Augmentation System (WAAS). Since the deployment of StarFire, the wide availability of mobile internet made CORS network a more popular and more precise solution.

== Background ==
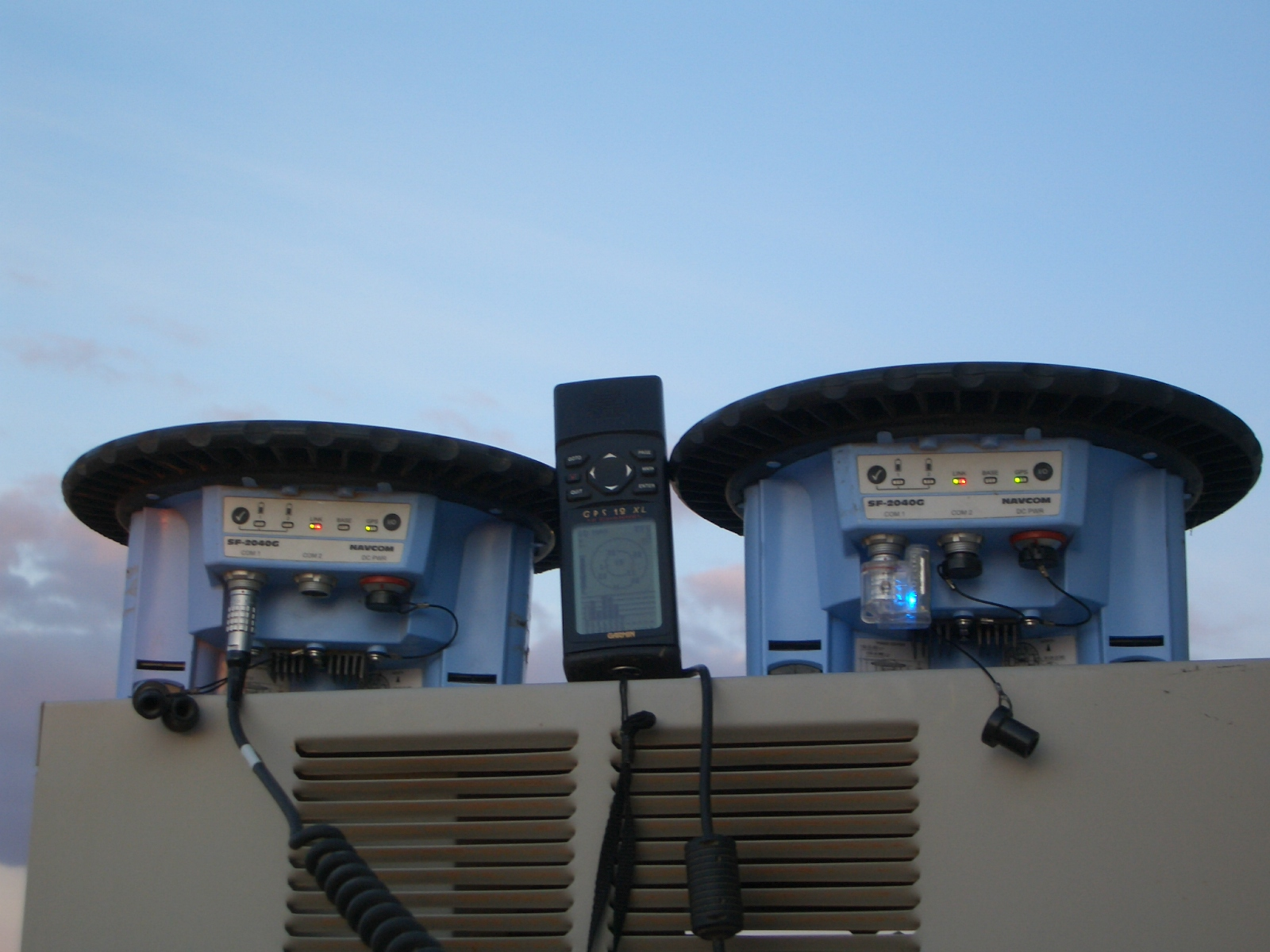
Two Navcom SF-2040G Receivers

StarFire came about after a meeting in 1994 among John Deere engineers who were attempting to chart a course for future developments. At the time, a number of smaller companies were attempting to introduce yield-mapping systems combining a GPS receiver with a grain counter, which produced maps of a field showing its yield. The engineers felt this was one of the most interesting developments in the industry, but the accuracy of GPS, then still using Selective Availability, was simply too low to produce a useful map. The various providers went bankrupt over the next few years.

In 1997, a team was formed to solve the problem of providing a more accurate GPS fix. Along with members of John Deere's engineering team, a small project at Stanford University also took part, along with NASA engineers at the Jet Propulsion Laboratory. They decided to produce a dGPS system that differed fairly dramatically from similar systems like WAAS.

== Addressing GPS inaccuracy ==
In theory the GPS signal with Selective Availability turned off offers accuracy on the order of 3 m. In practice, typical accuracy is about 15 m.

Of this 12 m, about 5 m is due to distortion from "billows" in the ionosphere, which introduce propagation delays that makes the satellite appear farther away than it really is. Another 3 to 4 m is accounted for by errors in the satellite ephemeris data, which is used to calculate the positions of the GPS satellites, and by clock drift in the satellite's internal atomic clocks.

dGPS correct for these errors by comparing the position measured using GPS with a known highly accurate ground reference, and then calculating the difference and broadcasting it to users. Some of these corrections apply to any location - the corrections to the clocks and ephemeris data for instance. In contrast, the billows cover only a certain portion of the sky, so a correction measured at any one ground station is only really useful for receivers located nearby. To make the corrections accurate over a large area, one would need to deploy many ground reference stations and broadcast a considerable amount of data for finely divided locations. For instance, WAAS uses twenty-five stations in the continental US, developing a grid spaced 5x5 degrees.

StarFire instead uses an advanced receiver to correct for ionospheric effects internally. To do this, it captures the P(Y) signal that is broadcast on two frequencies, L1 and L2, and compares the effects of the ionosphere on the propagation time of the two. Using this information, the ionospheric effects can be calculated to a very high degree of accuracy, meaning the StarFire dGPS can compensate for variations in propagation delay. The second P(Y) signal is encrypted and cannot be used by civilian receivers directly, but StarFire doesn't use the data contained in the signal; it only compares the phase of the two signals instead. This is expensive in terms of electronics, requiring a second tuner and excellent signal stability to be useful, which is why the StarFire-like solution is not more widely used (at least when it was being created).

With the ionospheric correction handled internally, the StarFire dGPS signal is greatly reduced in the amount of information it needs to carry, which consists of a set of correction signals for the satellite data alone. Since these corrections are globally valid, and there are only 24 satellites in operation at any time, the total amount of information is quite limited. StarFire broadcasts this data at 300 bits per second, repeating once a second. The corrections are generally valid for about 20 minutes. In addition to ephemeris and clock corrections, the signal also contains information on the health of each satellite, offering quality-of-service data in near real-time, with about a 3-second delay in updating the signals from the ground station.

== Versions ==
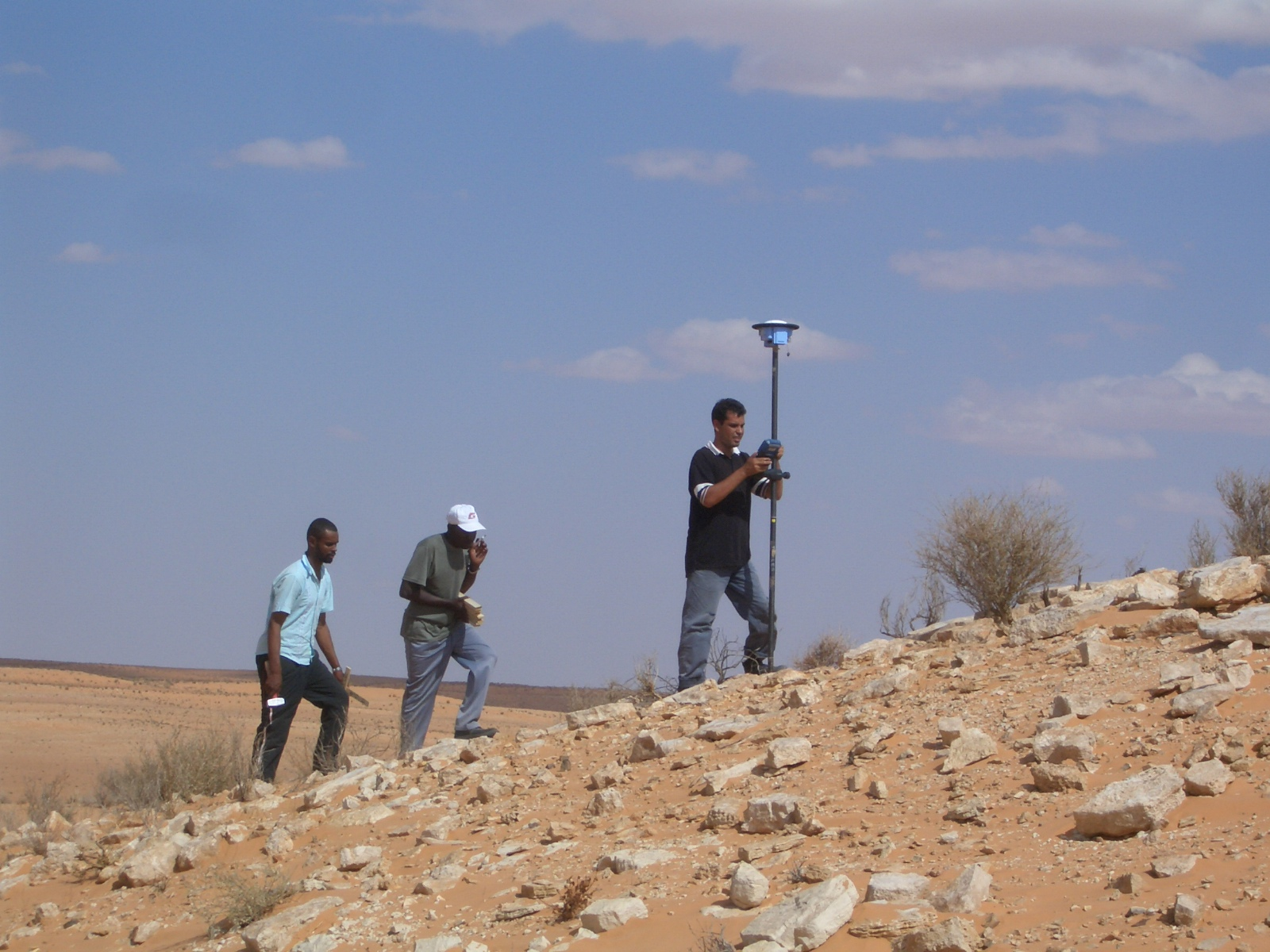
Survey crew using the pole-mounted Navcom SF-2040G receiver

StarFire has developed through two versions. The first, retroactively known as SF1, offered 1-sigma accuracy of about 1 m. Its error was about 15 to 30 cm, meaning that while the displayed position (absolute accuracy) might be off by about 1 m, it could return you to within centimeters of a previously measured spot (relative accuracy). This was enough for the intended role, field surveying. This system was first offered in 1998, and since its replacement the SF1 signal is apparently now offered for free.

The newer system, SF2, was introduced in 2004. It dramatically improves accuracy, with a 1-sigma absolute accuracy of about 4.5 cm. In other words, StarFire will leave you within 4.5 cm of a particular geographical point 65% of the time, and be accurate to under 10 cm around 95% of the time (2-sigma). The relative accuracy is likewise improved, to about 2.5 cm. Notably, the SF2 signal supplies corrections for both the American GPS constellation and the Russian GLONASS system.

John Deere introduced the SF3 signal in 2016, slightly improving accuracy and reducing pull-in time by 67% compared to SF2. The company deployed a total of 60 ground-based reference stations to generate the SF3 signal. As with SF2, SF3 supplies corrections for both GPS and GLONASS satellites.

Even if the StarFire correction signal is lost for more than 20 minutes, the internal ionospheric corrections alone result in accuracy of about 3 m. StarFire receivers also receive WAAS signals, ignoring their ionospheric data and using their (less detailed) ephemeris and clock adjustment data to provide about 50 cm accuracy. In comparison, "normal" GPS receivers generally offer about 15 m accuracy, and ones using WAAS improve this to about 3 m.

== Reference stations ==
When initially deployed, StarFire used seven reference stations in the continental US. The corrections generated at these stations are sent to two redundant processing stations (one co-located with a reference/monitor site), and then the resulting signal is uplinked from an east-coast US station. All of the stations are linked over the internet, with dedicated ISDN lines and VSAT links as backups. The resulting signals were broadcast from an Inmarsat III channel.

Additional StarFire networks were later set up in South America, Australia and Europe, each run from their own reference stations and sending data to their own satellites. As use of the system grew, the decision was made to link the various "local area" networks into a single global one. Today the StarFire network uses twenty-five stations worldwide, calculating and uplinking data from the US stations as before. The data collected at these stations is not location-dependent, in contrast to most dGPS, and the large number of sites is used primarily for redundancy.

== Variants ==
John Deere also sells a Real Time Kinematic dGPS, StarFire RTK. RTK consists of a small tripod-mounted GPS receiver that uses StarFire signals to perform its own dGPS calculations relative to a point, normally the corner of a field. The unit then broadcasts these corrections over a radio link to the equipment-mounted receivers. RTK offers absolute accuracy of about 2 cm, and relative accuracy in the millimeters. This sort of accuracy is used for fully automated equipment with autodrive systems.

== See also ==
- GNSS augmentation
- GPS signals
