= Local-area augmentation system =

All-weather aircraft landing system

LAAS architecture

The local-area augmentation system (LAAS) is an all-weather aircraft landing system based on real-time differential correction of the GPS signal. Local GPS reference receivers located at surveyed positions around the airport measure GPS deviations and calculate corrections which are sent to a central location at the airport. This data is used to formulate a correction message, which is then transmitted to users via a VHF data link (with a D8PSK modulation type like Mode 2 of the VHF Data Link used in aeronautical radio communications) in the frequency band between 108.00 and 117.95 MHz. A receiver on an aircraft uses this information to correct GPS signals, which then provides a standard instrument landing system (ILS)-style display to use while flying a precision approach. The U.S. Federal Aviation Administration, FAA has stopped using the term LAAS and has transitioned to the International Civil Aviation Organization (ICAO) terminology of ground-based augmentation system (GBAS). While the FAA has indefinitely delayed plans for federal GBAS acquisition, the system can be purchased by airports and installed as a Non-Federal navigation aid.

== History ==
The ground-based augmentation system (GBAS) is specified in Volume I of Annex 10 of the Convention on International Civil Aviation on radio-frequency navigation. This document provides International Civil Aviation Organization (ICAO) Standards and Recommended Practices (SARPS) for augmentation of GPS to support precision landing. The history of these standards can trace back to efforts in the United States by the Federal Aviation Administration to develop a local area augmentation system (LAAS). Many references still refer to LAAS, although the current international terminology is GBAS and GBAS landing system (GLS).

GBAS monitors GNSS satellites and provides correction messages to users in the vicinity of the GBAS station. The monitoring enables the GBAS to detect anomalous GPS satellite behavior and alert users in a time frame appropriate for aviation uses. The GBAS provides corrections to the GPS signals with a resulting improvement in accuracy sufficient to support aircraft precision approach operations. For more information on how GBAS works, see GBAS-How It Works publication.

Current GBAS standards only augment a single GNSS frequency and support landings to Category-I minima. These GBAS systems are identified as GBAS Approach Service Type C (GAST-C). Draft requirements for a GAST-D system are under review by ICAO. A GAST-D system will support operations to Category-III minima.

Many organizations are conducting research in multi-frequency GBAS (e.g. L1/L5). Other efforts are exploring the addition of differential corrections for additional GNSS satellite constellations (e.g. for Galileo) to GBAS. Such effort are conducted under the title 'dual frequency multi-constellation (DFMC) for GBAS', which is called GBAS Approach Service Type F (GAST-F).

Honeywell has developed a non-federal CAT-1 GBAS which received system design approval from the Federal Aviation Administration (FAA) in September 2009 [1]. The GBAS installation at Newark Liberty International Airport achieved operational approval on September 28, 2012. A second GBAS installed at Houston Intercontinental Airport received operational approval on April 23, 2013. Honeywell systems are also installed internationally. Among these is an operational GBAS at Frankfurt Airport, Germany, which is certified for Category II operations., Additional systems are installed or in the process of being installed. Operational approval of several more systems is expected shortly.

== Operation ==
Local reference receivers are located around an airport at precisely surveyed locations. The signal received from the GPS constellation is used to calculate the position of the LAAS ground station, which is then compared to its precisely surveyed position. This data is used to formulate a correction message which is transmitted to users via a VHF data link. A receiver on the aircraft uses this information to correct the GPS signals it receives. This information is used to create an ILS-type display for aircraft approach and landing purposes. Honeywell's CAT I system provides precision approach service within a radius of 23 NM surrounding a single airport. LAAS mitigates GPS threats in the Local Area to a much greater accuracy than WAAS and therefore provides a higher level of service not attainable by WAAS.

LAAS's VHF uplink signal is currently slated to share the frequency band from 108 MHz to 117.95 MHz with existing ILS localizer and VOR navigational aids. LAAS utilizes a time-division multiple access (TDMA) technology in servicing an entire airport with a single frequency assignment. Moreover, it is also beneficial, that it uses only frequency channels with 25 kHz spacing, to be compared with 50 kHz channels used by ILS and VOR. With future replacement of ILS, LAAS will reduce the congested VHF NAV band.

== Accuracy ==
The current Category-I (GAST-C) GBAS achieves a Category I precision approach accuracy of 16 m laterally and 4 m vertically. The goal of a to-be developed GAST-D GBAS is to provide Category III precision approach capability. The minimum accuracy for lateral and vertical errors of a Category III system are specified in RTCA DO-245A, Minimum Aviation System Performance Standards for Local Area Augmentation System (LAAS). The GAST-D GBAS will allow aircraft to land with zero visibility using 'autoland' systems.

== Benefits ==
One of the primary benefits of LAAS is that a single installation at a major airport can be used for multiple precision approaches within the local area. For example, since Chicago O'Hare has twelve runway ends, each with a separate ILS, all twelve ILS facilities can be replaced with a single LAAS system. This represents a significant cost savings in maintenance and upkeep of the existing ILS equipment.

Another benefit is the potential for approaches that are not straight-in. Aircraft equipped with LAAS technology can utilize curved or complex approaches such that they could be flown on to avoid obstacles or to decrease noise levels in areas surrounding an airport. This technology shares similar characteristics with the older microwave landing system (MLS) approaches, commonly seen in Europe. Both systems allow lower visibility requirements on complex approaches that traditional wide area augmentation systems (WAAS) and instrument landing systems (ILS) could not allow.

The FAA also contends that only a single set of navigational equipment will be needed on an aircraft for both LAAS and WAAS capability. This lowers initial cost and maintenance per aircraft since only one receiver is required instead of multiple receivers for NDB, DME, VOR, ILS, MLS, and GPS. The FAA hopes this will result in decreased cost to the airlines and passengers as well as general aviation.

== Drawbacks ==
LAAS shares the drawbacks of all RF based landing systems; those being jamming both intentional or accidental.

== Variations ==
The joint precision approach and landing system (JPALS) is a similar system for military usage. Honeywell has developed the Honeywell International Satellite Landing System (SLS) 4000 series (SLS-4000) which received system design approval from the FAA on September 3, 2009, with a follow-on approval of an enhanced SLS-4000 (SLS-4000 Block 1) in September 2012.

== Future ==
The FAA's National Airspace System (NAS) enterprise architecture is the blueprint for transforming the current NAS to the Next Generation Air Transportation System (NextGen). The NAS service roadmaps lay out the strategic activities for service delivery to improve NAS operations and move towards the NextGen vision. They show the evolution of major FAA investments/programs in today's NAS services to meet the future demand. The GBAS precision approaches is one of the investment programs that provide solution to "increase flexibility in the terminal environment" in the NextGen implementation plan.

The FAA expected to replace legacy navigation systems with satellite based navigation technology; however the FAA has indefinitely delayed plans for federal GBAS acquisition, the system can be purchased by airports and installed as a non-federal navigation aid. The FAA continues to develop GBAS systems and seek international standardization.

== Standards ==
- International Standards and Recommended Practices – AERONAUTICAL TELECOMMUNICATIONS, Annex 10 to the Convention on International Civil Aviation (ICAO), Volume I (Radio Navigation Aids), Amendment 93, Chapter 3.7.3.5, Montreal 2023
- RTCA DO-246-E, GNSS-Based Precision Approach Local Area Augmentation System (LAAS) Signal-In-Space Interface Control Document (ICD),
- RTCA DO-253-D, Minimum Operational Performance Standard (MOPS) for GPS/GBAS airborne equipment,
- EUROCAE ED-114B, Minimum Operational Performance Standard (MOPS) for Global Navigation Satellite Ground Based Augmentation System Ground Equipment to support Precision Approach and Landing,
- ETSI EN 303 084, V2.1.1, Ground Based Augmentation System (GBAS) VHF ground-air Data Broadcast (VDB); Technical characteristics and methods of measurement for ground-based equipment; Harmonised Standard covering the essential requirements of article 3.2 of the Directive 2014/53/EU

== See also ==
- Index of aviation articles
- Acronyms and abbreviations in avionics
- Differential GPS
- Global Positioning System
- GNSS augmentation
- GPS and GEO augmented Navigation
- Instrument landing system: ILS
- Joint precision approach and landing system is a similar system for military usage.
- Precision approach
- WAAS
- EGNOS
- Autoland
