= Autoland =

Automated aircraft landing procedure

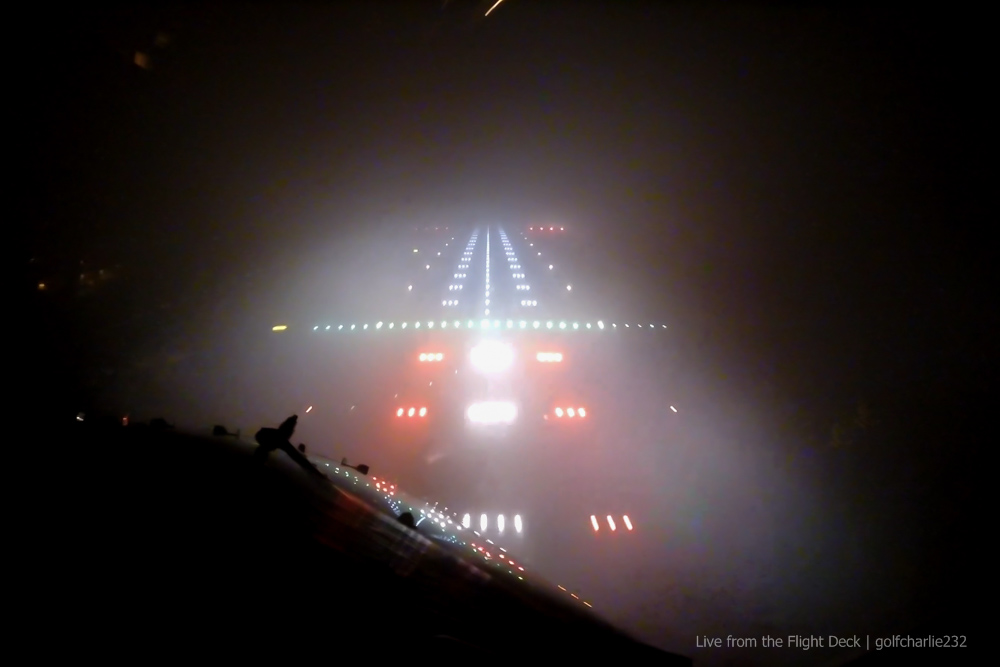
CAT IIIA landing

In aviation, autoland describes a system that fully automates the landing procedure of an aircraft's flight, with the flight crew supervising the process. Such systems enable airliners to land in weather conditions that would otherwise be dangerous or impossible to operate in.

A few general aviation aircraft have begun to be fitted with "emergency autoland" systems that can be activated by passengers, or by automated crew monitoring systems. The emergency autoland systems are designed to complete an emergency landing at the nearest suitable airport, without any further human intervention, in the event that the flight crew is incapacitated.

== Description ==
Autoland systems were designed to make landing possible in visibility too poor to permit any form of visual landing, although they can be used at any level of visibility. They are usually used when visibility is less than 600 meters runway visual range and/or in adverse weather conditions, although limitations do apply for most aircraft—for example, for a Boeing 747-400 the limitations are a maximum headwind of 25 kts, a maximum tailwind of 10 kts, a maximum crosswind component of 25 kts, and a maximum crosswind with one engine inoperative of five knots. They may also include automatic braking to a full stop once the aircraft is on the ground, in conjunction with the autobrake system, and sometimes auto deployment of spoilers and thrust reversers.

Autoland may be used for any suitably approved instrument landing system (ILS) or microwave landing system (MLS) approach, and is sometimes used to maintain currency of the aircraft and crew, as well as for its main purpose of assisting an aircraft landing in low visibility and/or bad weather.

Autoland requires the use of a radar altimeter to determine the aircraft's height above the ground very precisely so as to initiate the landing flare at the correct height (usually about 50 feet (15 m)). The localizer signal of the ILS may be used for lateral control even after touchdown until the autopilot is disengaged. For safety reasons, once autoland is engaged and the ILS signals have been acquired by the autoland system, it will proceed to landing without further intervention.

It can be disengaged only by completely disconnecting the autopilot (this prevents accidental disengagement of the autoland system at a critical moment) or by initiating an automatic go-around. At least two and often three independent autopilot systems work in concert to carry out autoland, thus providing redundant protection against failures. Most autoland systems can operate with a single autopilot in an emergency, but they are only certified when multiple autopilots are available.

The autoland system's response rate to external stimuli work very well in conditions of reduced visibility and relatively calm or steady winds, but the purposefully limited response rate means they are not generally smooth in their responses to varying wind shear or gusting wind conditions – i.e., not able to compensate in all dimensions rapidly enough – to safely permit their use.

The first aircraft to be certified to CAT III standards, on 28 December 1968, was the Sud Aviation Caravelle, followed by the Hawker-Siddeley HS.121 Trident in May 1972 (CAT IIIA) and to CAT IIIB during 1975. The Trident had been certified to CAT II on 7 February 1968. Besides providing automatic landing, automatic ground roll and extensive en route facilities, the Trident's AFCS (Automatic Flight Control System) also provided automatic overshoot (go-round) which was essential for Cat II operation, PVD (paravisual display) ground roll guidance for take-off in 100 metres runway visual range (RVR) and as back up to the ‘fail-soft’ automatic rudder control system during Cat. IIIB landings, and a Ground Run Monitor (GRM) for measuring ground speed and distance travelled as an aid for estimating runway turn-off points and taxying.

Autoland capability has seen the most rapid adoption in areas and on aircraft that must frequently operate in very poor visibility. Airports troubled by fog on a regular basis are prime candidates for Category III approaches, and including autoland capability on jet airliners helps reduce the likelihood that they will be forced to divert by bad weather.

Autoland is highly accurate. In his 1959 paper, John Charnley, then Superintendent of the UK Royal Aircraft Establishment's (RAE) Blind Landing Experimental Unit (BLEU), concluded a discussion of statistical results by saying that "It is fair to claim, therefore, that not only will the automatic system land the aircraft when the weather prevents the human pilot, it also performs the operation much more precisely".

Previously, autoland systems have been so expensive that they were rarely used on small aircraft. However, as display technology has developed, the addition of a head up display (HUD) allows for a trained pilot to manually fly the aircraft using guidance cues from the flight guidance system. This significantly reduces the cost of operating in very low visibility, and allows aircraft that are not equipped for automatic landings to make a manual landing safely at lower levels of look ahead visibility or runway visual range (RVR). In 1989, Alaska Airlines was the first airline in the world to manually land a passenger-carrying jet (Boeing B727) in FAA Category III weather (dense fog) made possible with the head-up guidance system.

== History ==
=== Background ===
Commercial aviation autoland was initially developed in the United Kingdom, as a result of the frequent occurrence of very low visibility conditions in winter in Northwest Europe. These occur particularly when anticyclones are in place over Central Europe in November/December/January when temperatures are low, and radiation fog easily forms in relatively stable air. The severity of this type of fog was exacerbated in the late 1940s and 1950s by the prevalence of carbon and other smoke particles in the air from coal burning heating and power generation.

Cities particularly affected included the main UK centers, and their airports such as London Heathrow, London Gatwick, Manchester, Birmingham and Glasgow, as well as European cities such as Amsterdam, Brussels, Paris, Zurich and Milan. Visibility at these times could become as low as a few feet (hence the London fogs of movie fame) and, when combined with the soot, created lethal long-persistence smog. These conditions led to the passing of the UK's "Clean Air Act," which banned the burning of smoke-producing fuel.

During the immediate post-war period, British European Airways (BEA) suffered a number of accidents during approach and landing in poor visibility, which caused it to focus on the problems of how pilots could land safely in such conditions. A major breakthrough came with the recognition that in such low visibility the very limited visual information available (lights and so on) was extraordinarily easy to misinterpret, especially when the requirement to assess it was combined with a requirement to simultaneously fly the aircraft on instruments. This led to the development of what is now widely understood as the "monitored approach" procedure.

One pilot is assigned the task of accurate instrument flying while the other assesses the visual cues available at decision height, taking control to execute the landing once satisfied that the aircraft is in fact in the correct place and on a safe trajectory for a landing. The result was a major improvement in the safety of operations in low visibility, and as the concept clearly incorporates vast elements of what is now known as crew resource management (although predating this phrase by some three decades) it was expanded to encompass a far broader spectrum of operations than just low visibility.

However, associated with this "human factors" approach was a recognition that improved autopilots could play a major part in low-visibility landings. The components of all landings are the same, involving navigation from a point at altitude en route to a point where the wheels are on the desired runway. This navigation is accomplished using information from either external, physical, visual cues, or from synthetic cues such as flight instruments. At all times, there must be sufficient total information to ensure that the aircraft's position and trajectory (vertical and horizontal) are correct.

The problem with low visibility operations is that the visual cues may be reduced to effectively zero, and hence there is an increased reliance on "synthetic" information. The dilemma faced by BEA was to find a way to operate without cues, because this situation occurred on its network with far greater frequency than on that of any other airline. It was particularly prevalent at its home base, London Heathrow, which could effectively be closed for days at a time.

=== Development of autoland ===
The United Kingdom government's aviation research facilities including the Blind Landing Experimental Unit (BLEU) set up during 1945/46 at RAF Martlesham Heath and RAF Woodbridge to research all the relevant factors. BEA's flight technical personnel were heavily involved in BLEU's activities in the development of Autoland for its Trident fleet from the late 1950s. The work included analysis of fog structures, human perception, instrument design, and lighting cues amongst many others. After further accidents, this work also led to the development of aircraft operating minima in the form we know them today. In particular, it led to the requirement that a minimum visibility must be reported as available before the aircraft may commence an approach – a concept that had not existed previously. The basic concept of a "target level of safety" (10^-7) and of the analysis of "fault trees" to determine probability of failure events stemmed from about this period.

The basic concept of autoland flows from the fact that an autopilot could be set up to track an artificial signal such as an Instrument Landing System (ILS) beam more accurately than a human pilot could – not least because of the inadequacies of the electro-mechanical flight instruments of the time. If the ILS beam could be tracked to a lower height then clearly the aircraft would be nearer to the runway when it reached the limit of ILS usability, and nearer to the runway less visibility would be required to see sufficient cues to confirm the aircraft position and trajectory. With an angular signal system such as ILS, as altitude decreases all tolerances must be decreased – in both the aircraft system and the input signal – to maintain the required degree of safety.

This is because certain other factors – physical and physiological laws which govern for example the pilot's ability to make the aircraft respond – remain constant. For example, at 300 feet above the runway on a standard 3 degree approach the aircraft will be 6000 feet from the touchdown point, and at 100 feet it will be 2000 feet out. If a small course correction needs 10 seconds to be effected at 180 kts it will take 3000 ft. It will be possible if initiated at 300 feet of height, but not at 100 feet. Consequently, only a smaller course correction can be tolerated at the lower height, and the system needs to be more accurate.

This imposes a requirement for the ground-based, guidance element to conform to specific standards, as well as the airborne elements. Thus, while an aircraft may be equipped with an autoland system, it will be totally unusable without the appropriate ground environment. Similarly, it requires a crew trained in all aspects of the operation to recognize potential failures in both airborne and ground equipment, and to react appropriately, to be able to use the system in the circumstances for which it is intended. Consequently, the low visibility operations categories (Cat I, Cat II and Cat III) apply to all 3 elements in the landing – the aircraft equipment, the ground environment, and the crew. The result of all this is to create a spectrum of low visibility equipment, in which an aircraft's autoland autopilot is just one component.

The development of these systems proceeded by recognizing that although the ILS would be the source of the guidance, the ILS itself contains lateral and vertical elements that have rather different characteristics. In particular, the vertical element (glideslope) originates from the projected touchdown point of the approach, i.e., typically 1000 ft from the beginning of the runway, while the lateral element (localizer) originates from beyond the far end. The transmitted glideslope therefore becomes irrelevant soon after the aircraft has reached the runway threshold, and in fact the aircraft has of course to enter its landing mode and reduce its vertical velocity quite a long time before it passes the glideslope transmitter. The inaccuracies in the basic ILS could be seen in that it was suitable for use down to 200 ft. only (Cat I), and similarly no autopilot was suitable for or approved for use below this height.

The lateral guidance from the ILS localizer would, however, be usable right to the end of the landing roll, and hence is used to feed the rudder channel of the autopilot after touchdown. As aircraft approach the transmitter, its speed is obviously reducing and rudder effectiveness diminishes, compensating to some extent for the increased sensitivity of the transmitted signal. More significantly, however, it means the safety of the aircraft is still dependent on the ILS during rollout. Furthermore, as it taxis off the runway and down any parallel taxiway, it itself acts a reflector and can interfere with the localizer signal. This means that it can affect the safety of any following aircraft still using the localizer. As a result, such aircraft cannot be allowed to rely on that signal until the first aircraft is well clear of the runway and the "Cat. 3 protected area".

The result is that when these low visibility operations are taking place, operations on the ground affect operations in the air much more than in good visibility, when pilots can see what is happening. At very busy airports, this results in restrictions in movement which can in turn severely impact the airport's capacity. In short, very low visibility operations such as autoland can only be conducted when aircraft, crews, ground equipment and air and ground traffic control all comply with more stringent requirements than normal.

The first "commercial development" automatic landings (as opposed to pure experimentation) were achieved through realizing that the vertical and lateral paths had different rules. Although the localizer signal would be present throughout the landing, the glide slope had to be disregarded before touchdown in any event. It was recognized that if the aircraft had arrived at decision height (200 ft) on a correct, stable approach path – a prerequisite for a safe landing – it would have momentum along that path. Consequently, the autoland system could discard the glideslope information when it became unreliable (i.e., at 200 ft), and use of pitch information derived from the last several seconds of flight would ensure to the required degree of reliability that the descent rate (and hence adherence to the correct profile) would remain constant. This "ballistic" phase would end at the height when it became necessary to increase pitch and reduce power to enter the landing flare. The pitch change occurs over the runway in the 1000 horizontal feet between the threshold and the glide slope antenna, and so can be accurately triggered by radio altimeter.

Autoland was first developed in BLEU and Royal Air Force (RAF) aircraft such as the English Electric Canberra, Vickers Varsity and Avro Vulcan, and later for BEA's Trident fleet, which entered service in the early 1960s. The Trident was a 3-engined jet built by de Havilland with a similar configuration to the Boeing 727, and was extremely sophisticated for its time. BEA had specified a "zero-visibility" capability for it to deal with the problems of its fog-prone network. It had an autopilot designed to provide the necessary redundancy to tolerate failures during autoland, and it was this design which had triple redundancy.

This autopilot used three simultaneous processing channels each giving a physical output. The fail-safe element was provided by a "voting" procedure using torque switches, whereby it was accepted that in the event that one channel differed from the other two, the probability of two similar simultaneous failures could be discounted and the two channels in agreement would "out-vote" and disconnect the third channel. However, this triple-voting system is by no means the only way to achieve adequate redundancy and reliability, and in fact soon after BEA and de Havilland had decided to go down that route, a parallel trial was set up using a "dual-dual" concept, chosen by BOAC and Vickers for the VC10 4-engined long range aircraft. This concept was later used on the Concorde. Some BAC 1-11 aircraft used by BEA also had a similar system.

=== Civil aviation ===
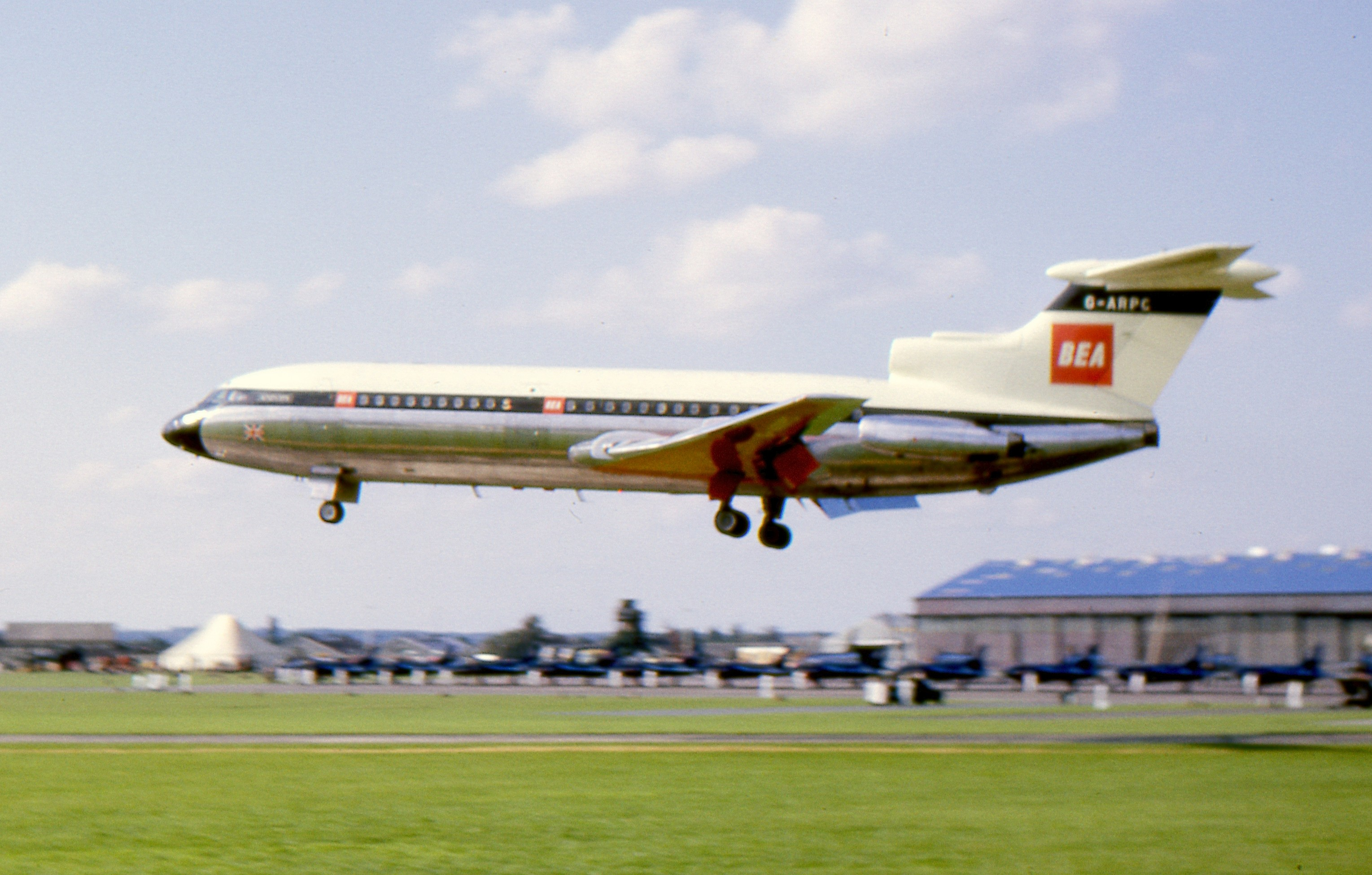
A BEA Hawker Siddeley Trident

The earliest experimental autopilot-controlled landings in commercial service were not in fact full auto landings but were termed "auto-flare". In this mode, the pilot controlled the roll and yaw axes manually while the autopilot controlled the "flare" or pitch. These were often done in passenger service as part of the development program. The Trident's autopilot had separate engagement switches for the pitch and roll components, and although the normal autopilot disengagement was by means of a conventional control yoke thumb-button, it was also possible to disengage the roll channel while leaving the pitch channel engaged.

In these operations, the pilot had acquired full visual reference, normally well above decision height, but instead of fully disengaging the autopilot with the thumb-button, called for the second officer to latch off the roll channel only. The second officer then controlled the lateral flight path manually while monitoring the autopilot's continued control of the vertical flight path – ready to completely disengage it at the first sign of any deviation. While this sounds as if it may add a risk element, in practice it is of course no different in principle than a training pilot monitoring a trainee's handling during on-line training or qualification.

Having proven the reliability and accuracy of the autopilot's ability to safely flare the aircraft, the next elements were to add in similar control of the thrust. This was done by a radio altimeter signal which drove the autothrottle servos to a flight idle setting. As the accuracy and reliability of the ground based ILS localiser was increased on a step by step basis, it was permissible to leave the roll channel engaged longer and longer, until in fact the aircraft had ceased to be airborne, and a fully automatic landing had in fact been completed. The first such landing in a BEA Trident was achieved at RAE Bedford (by then home of BLEU) in March 1964. The first on a commercial flight with passengers aboard was achieved on flight BE 343 on 10 June 1965, with a Trident 1 G-ARPR, from Paris to Heathrow with Captains Eric Poole and Frank Ormonroyd.

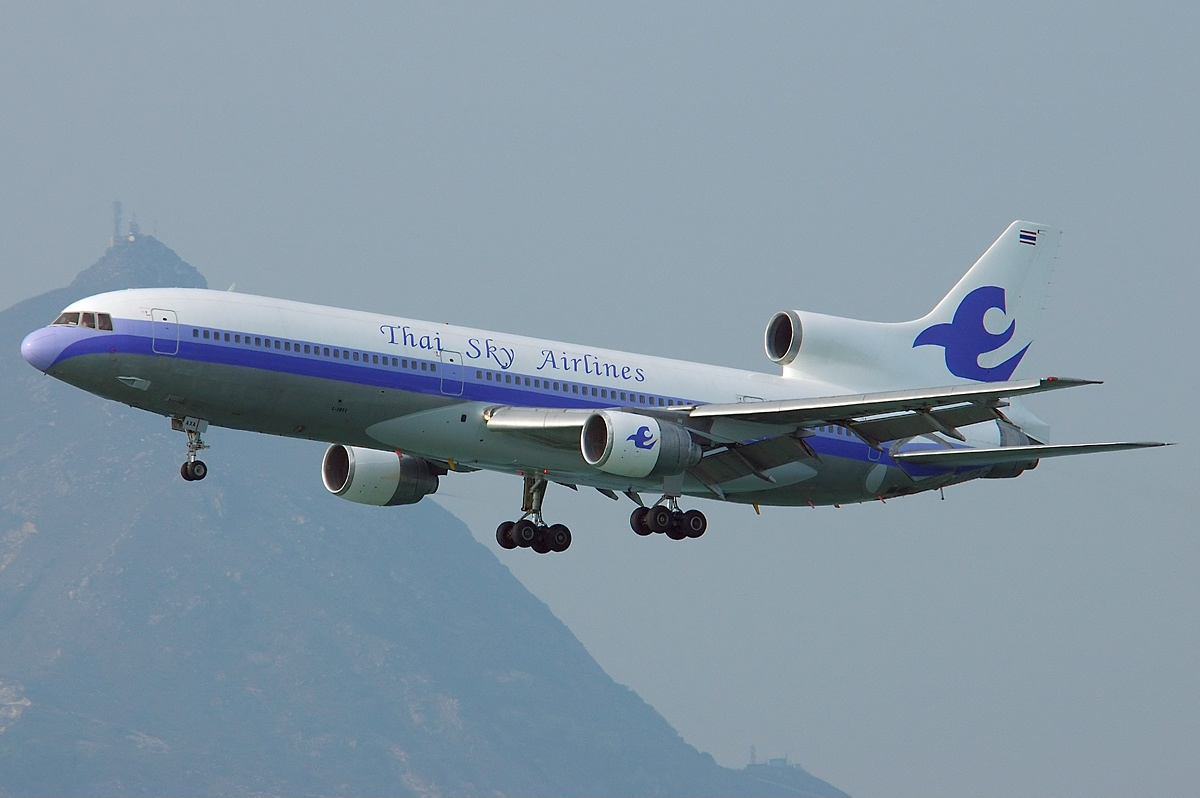
The Lockheed L-1011 TriStar had its autoland functionality placed in key roles during its marketing.

Subsequently, autoland systems became available on a number of aircraft types but the primary customers were those mainly European airlines whose networks were severely affected by radiation fog. Early autoland systems needed a relatively stable air mass and could not operate in conditions of turbulence and in particular gusty crosswinds. In North America, it was generally the case that reduced but not zero visibility was often associated with these conditions, and if the visibility really became almost zero in, for example, blowing snow or other precipitation then operations would be impossible for other reasons.

As a result, neither airlines nor airports placed a high priority on operations in the lowest visibility. The provision of the necessary ground equipment (ILS) and associated systems for Category 3 operations was almost non existent and the major manufacturers did not regard it as a basic necessity for new aircraft. In general, during the 1970s and 1980s, it was available if a customer wanted it, but at such a high price (due to being a reduced production run item) that few airlines could see a cost justification for it.

This led to the absurd situation for British Airways that as the launch customer for the Boeing 757 to replace the Trident, the brand-new "advanced" aircraft had inferior all-weather operations capability compared to the fleet being broken up for scrap. An indication of this philosophical divide is the comment from a senior Boeing vice president that he could not understand why British Airways were so concerned about the Category 3 certification, as there were only at that time two or three suitable runways in North America on which it could be fully used. It was pointed out that British Airways had 12 such runways on its domestic network alone, four of them at its main base at Heathrow.

In the 1980s and 1990s, there was increasing pressure globally from customer airlines for at least some improvements in low visibility operations; both for flight regularity and from safety considerations. At the same time, it became evident that the requirement for a true zero-visibility operation (as originally envisaged in the ICAO Category definitions) had diminished, as clean-air laws had reduced the adverse effect of smoke adding to radiation fog in the worst affected areas. Improved avionics meant that the technology became cheaper to implement, and manufacturers raised the standard of the "basic" autopilot accuracy and reliability. The result was that, on the whole, the larger new airliners were now able to absorb the costs of at least Category 2 autoland systems into their basic configuration.

Simultaneously, pilot organizations globally were advocating the use of Head Up Display systems primarily from a safety viewpoint. Many operators in non-sophisticated environments without many ILS equipped runways were also looking for improvements. The net effect was pressure within the industry to find alternative ways to achieve low visibility operations, such as a "hybrid" system which used a relatively low reliability autoland system monitored by the pilots via a HUD. Alaska Airlines was a leader in this approach and undertook a lot of development work with Flight Dynamics and Boeing in this respect.

A major problem with this approach was that European authorities were very reluctant to certificate such schemes as they undermined the well-proven concepts of "pure" autoland systems. This impasse was broken when British Airways became involved as a potential customer for Bombardier's Regional Jet, which could not accommodate a full Cat 3 autoland system, but would be required to operate in those conditions. By working with Alaska Airlines and Boeing, British Airways technical pilots were able to demonstrate that a hybrid concept was feasible, and although British Airways never eventually bought the regional jet, this was the breakthrough needed for international approval for such systems which meant that they could reach a global market.

The wheel turned full circle in December 2006 when London Heathrow was affected for a long period by dense fog. This airport was operating at maximum capacity in good conditions, and the imposition of low visibility procedures required to protect the localizer signal for autoland systems meant a major reduction in capacity from approximately 60 to 30 landings per hour. Since most airlines operating into Heathrow already had autoland-equipped aircraft, and thus expected to operate as normal, massive delays occurred. The worst affected airline was British Airways, as it was the largest operator at the airport.

=== Emergency autoland ===
Garmin Aviation started studying an emergency autoland feature in 2001 and launched the program in 2010 with more than 100 employees, investing around $20 million. Flight tests began in 2014 with 329 test landings completed in a Cessna 400 Corvalis and another 300 landings in other aircraft. The feature is activated by a guarded red button on Garmin G3000 avionics. It evaluates winds, weather and fuel reserves to select a suitable diversion airport and takes over the aircraft controls to land. In addition, it advises ATC of the feature's intentions and displays instructions to occupants.

A Piper M600 single-engine turboprop aircraft began flight tests in early 2018 and completed more than 170 landings to seek pending FAA certification, which it achieved in 2020. Providing access to more than 9,000 runways over 4,500 ft (1,400 m) in length, it is offered from 2020 for $170,000 including extra equipment. It was also certified for the single-engine Cirrus Vision SF50 jet that same year, landing on runways over 5,836 ft (1,779 m), the SOCATA-Daher TBM 900, and will eventually be certified on other aircraft.

In June 2021, the Garmin Autoland system won the 2020 Collier Trophy, for "the greatest achievement in aeronautics or astronautics in America" during the preceding year.

On December 20, 2025, the first recorded true emergency activation of a fully autonomous Autoland system occurred after avionic-detection of unsafe low cabin pressure initiated the system in a Beechcraft Super King Air B200 twin-turboprop aircraft (call sign N479BR) culminating in a full-stop landing and post-landing engine shutdown. The Autoland system, which automatically chose a suitable airport, flight plan, and descent from high altitude pattern, landed safely at Rocky Mountain Metropolitan Airport Broomfield, Colorado. During the event, the autoland subsystem tuned the radio to proper tower frequency, transmitted computer-enunciated voice radio messages including call sign, pilot incapacitation, aircraft position, and estimated time of arrival to the chosen airport. Updates were transmitted every few minutes to which ground emergency units and air traffic controllers prepared the airport and cleared approach airspace for the emergency aircraft. The incident marked the first recorded instance of a fully navigated and planned, pilot-incapacitation autoland in U.S. general aviation history.

== Systems ==
A typical autoland system consists of an ILS (integrated glideslope receiver, localizer receiver, and perhaps GPS receiver as well) radio to receive the localizer and glideslope signals. The output of this radio will be a deviation from center which is provided to the flight control computer; this computer controls the aircraft control surfaces to maintain the aircraft centered on the localizer and glideslope. The flight control computer also controls the aircraft throttles to maintain the appropriate approach speed.

At the appropriate height above the ground (as indicated by the radio altimeter) the flight control computer will retard the throttles and initiate a pitch-up maneuver. The purpose of this "flare" is to produce lift and drag on the aircraft. These aerodynamic forces reduce descent rate and forward airspeed respectively, allowing the aircraft to settle onto the runway.

For CAT IIIc, the flight control computer will continue to accept deviations from the localizer and use the rudder to maintain the aircraft on the localizer (which is aligned with the runway centerline). On landing, the spoilers will deploy; these are surfaces on the top of the wing towards the trailing edge which cause airflow over the wing to become turbulent, destroying lift. At the same time the autobrake system will apply the brakes. The anti-skid system will modulate brake pressure to keep all wheels turning. As the speed decreases, the rudder will lose effectiveness and the pilot will need to control the direction of the airplane using nose wheel steering, a system which typically is not connected to the flight control computer.

From an avionics safety perspective, a CAT IIIc landing is the worst-case scenario for safety analysis because a failure of the automatic systems from flare through the roll-out could easily result in a "hard over" (where a control surface deflects fully in one direction). This would happen so fast that the flight crew may not effectively respond. For this reason, autoland systems are designed to incorporate a high degree of redundancy so that a single failure of any part of the system can be tolerated and a second failure can be detected – at which point the autoland system will turn itself off (uncouple, fail passive).

One way of accomplishing this is to have "three of everything." Three ILS receivers, three radio altimeters, three flight control computers, and three ways of controlling the flight surfaces. The three flight control computers all work in parallel and are in constant cross communications, comparing their inputs (ILS receivers and radio altimeters) with those of the other two flight control computers. If there is a difference in inputs, then a computer can "vote out" the deviant input and will notify the other computers that (for instance) "RA1 is faulty." If the outputs don't match, a computer can declare itself as faulty and, if possible, take itself off line.

When the pilot arms the system (prior to capture of either the localizer or glideslope) the flight control computers perform an extensive series of built-in tests. For a CAT III landing, all the sensors and all the flight computers must be in good health before the pilot receives an "AUTOLAND ARM" indication (generic indications that will vary depending on equipment supplier and aircraft manufacturer). If part of the system is in error, then an indication such as "APPROACH ONLY" would be presented to inform the flight crew that a CAT III landing is not possible.

If the system is properly in the ARM mode, when the ILS receiver detects the localizer, then the autoland system mode will change to "LOCALIZER CAPTURE". The flight control computer will turn the aircraft into the localizer and fly along the localizer. A typical approach will have the aircraft come in "below the glideslope" (vertical guidance) so the airplane will fly along the localizer (aligned to the runway centerline) until the glideslope is detected. At this point, the autoland mode will change to CAT III and the aircraft will be flown by the flight control computer along the localizer and glideslope beams.

The antennas for these systems are not at the runway touch down point, with the localizer being some distance beyond the runway. At a predefined distance above the ground, the aircraft will initiate the flare maneuver, maintain the same heading, and settle onto the runway within the designated touch down zone.

If the autoland system loses redundancy prior to the decision height, then an "AUTOLAND FAULT" error message will be displayed to the flight crew, at which point the crew can elect to continue as a CAT II approach or, if this is not possible because of weather conditions, then the crew would need to initiate a go-around and proceed to an alternative airport.

If a single failure occurs below decision height, "AUTOLAND FAULT" will be displayed; at that point the aircraft is committed to landing and the autoland system will remain engaged, controlling the aircraft on only two systems until the pilot completes the rollout and brings the aircraft to a full stop on the runway or turns off the runway onto a taxiway. This is termed "fail-active." In this state the autoland system is "one fault away" from disengaging so the "AUTOLAND FAULT" indication should inform the flight crew to monitor the system behavior very carefully and be ready to take control immediately.

The system is still fail-active and is still performing all necessary cross-checks so that, if one of the flight control computers decides that the right thing to do is order a full deflection of a control surface, the other computer will detect that there is a difference in the commands and this will take both computers off line (fail-passive). At this time, the flight crew must immediately take control of the aircraft as the automatic systems have done the safe thing by taking themselves off line.

During system design, the predicted reliability numbers for the individual equipment which makes up the entire autoland system (sensors, computers, controls, and so forth) are combined and an overall probability of failure is calculated. As the threat exists primarily during the flare through roll-out, this exposure time is used and the overall failure probability must be less than one in a million.

== See also ==
- Acronyms and abbreviations in avionics
- LAAS
- Instrument landing system
- Head-up display
- Fog
