= Runway status lights =

Aviation safety system

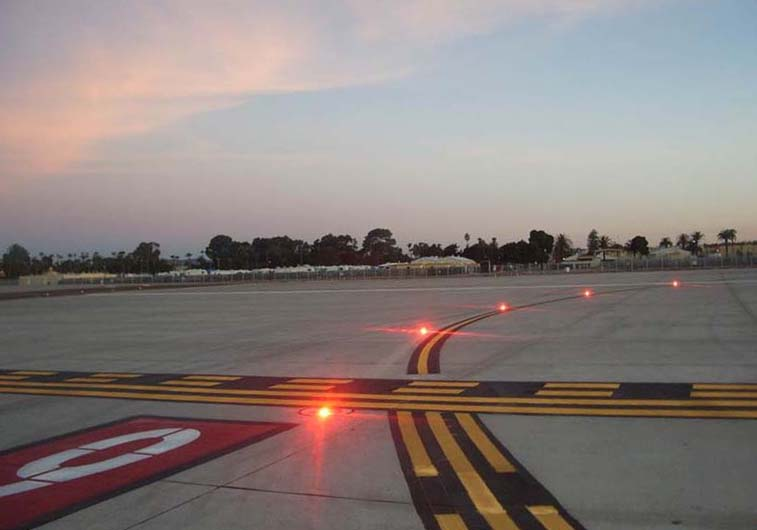
Runway Status Lighting (RWSL) activated at San Diego International Airport

Runway Status Lights (RWSL) are a visual alerting system installed in some airport taxiways and runways for the purpose of collision-avoidance. When illuminated, red high-intensity LEDs indicate the presence of another vehicle either departing, occupying, or landing on an active runway. RWSL systems are fully-automated and intended to alert aircrews and ground vehicle operators of a potential runway incursion hazard. They operate as an additional layer of safety, independent of human-issued air traffic control clearances.

The system works by processing traffic position and movement data generated by transponders aboard aircraft and airside ground-vehicles such as aircraft rescue and firefighting (ARFF) units, aircraft tugs, and snow-clearing equipment. That data is concentrated by Airport Surface Detection Equipment (ASDE) or Airport Surface Surveillance Capability (ASSC) systems and fed to a path-predicting computer algorithm. If potential traffic conflicts are detected, the appropriate lights are automatically turned on or off according to the system's control logic.

== Background ==
At all airports with air-traffic-control towers, the movement of airside vehicles is coordinated by controllers who ensure efficient and safe operation through the use of clearances and separation standards. With few exceptions (like an aircraft occupying a runway under a "line up and wait" clearance), an active runway is typically used by only one entity at a time. When an unauthorized person or vehicle enters a runway, whether intentional or accidental, the conflict is known as a runway incursion. Many notable aviation accidents and incidents have been caused by such a scenario, including the Tenerife airport disaster, which remains the deadliest airplane accident in history.

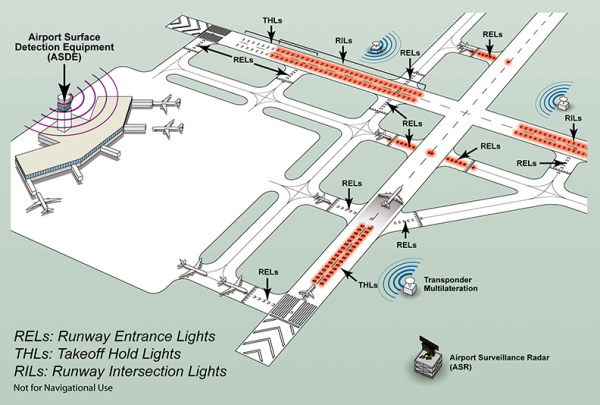
RWSL Operational Concept

By the mid-1980s, runway incursion prevention began to attract special attention from aviation authorities, especially in the United States. After several high-profile accidents including Eastern Airlines 111 and the 1991 Los Angeles airport runway collision, the National Transportation Safety Board highlighted the need to find new technologies that could address the issue. In 1991, the NTSB issued a formal safety recommendation that the directed the FAA to develop "an alternate, cost effective, system to bring controller and pilot attention to pending runway incursions in time to prevent ground collisions."

Development on RWSL began as early as 1992 by Massachusetts Institute of Technology's Lincoln Laboratory. According to an FAA statement, the system was to include "lights, positioned at the edge of the runway so that they would be visible from aircraft cockpits at the runway entrances, [that] would be activated when sensors notified the system of aircraft on approach or aircraft accelerating and decelerating on the runway." The initial proof-of-concept began in 1992 at Boston's Logan International Airport with a model-board driven by algorithms processing inputs from marine-band radar and the Automated Radar Terminal System (ARTS). After proceeding with installation of over 170 lights in the real-world environment and collecting data across 8,298 aircraft operations, the system was determined to be feasible and successful at meeting its objectives. During the proof-of-concept, the RWSL achieved over 98% agreement with ATC-issued instructions.

In 2010, FAA approved funding to install RWSL at 23 airports from fiscal year 2011 to fiscal year 2016 at a cost of $327 million.

== Components ==
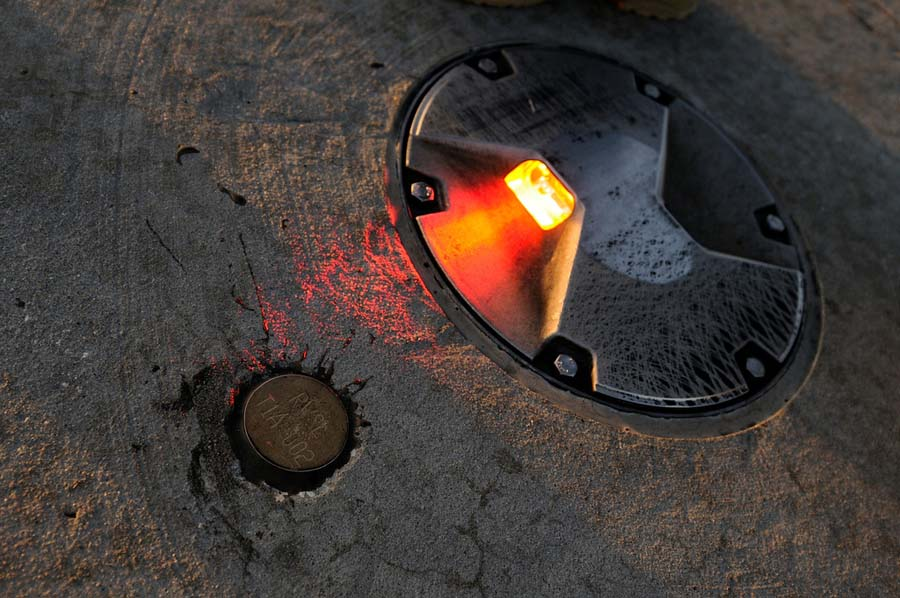
Runway entrance light (REL) installed in a taxiway

Two subsystems, the RWSL Processor and the Field Lighting System (FLS), work together to automatically illuminate and extinguish the in-pavement lights. The processor uses surveillance data to analyze real-time airport surface operations. The FLS provides the physical interface from the processor to the runway lights.

- RWSL Processor
- Field Lighting System (FLS)
  - Runway Entrance Lights (REL): Red unidirectional lights along taxiway centerlines entering a runway.
  - Takeoff Hold Lights (THL): Red unidirectional lights in a double-longitudinal row, located parallel to runway centerline lighting.
  - Runway Intersection Lights (RIL): Similar to THLs, but located on a runway, prior to intersection with another runway.

On taxiways, Runway Entrance Lights (RELs) show that runways are not safe to enter or cross. On runways, Takeoff Hold Lights (THLs) show pilots that it is not yet safe to begin their takeoff.

== Deployment ==
As of November 2022 the FAA has RWSL systems in operation at twenty US airports:

- Orlando International Airport (Orlando, FL)
- Phoenix Sky Harbor International Airport (Phoenix, AZ)
- George Bush Intercontinental Airport (Houston, TX)
- Baltimore-Washington International Thurgood Marshall Airport (Baltimore, MD)
- Harry Reid International Airport (Las Vegas, NV)
- Charlotte Douglas International Airport (Charlotte, NC)
- Los Angeles International Airport (Los Angeles, CA)
- Seattle-Tacoma International Airport (Seattle, WA)
- Chicago O’Hare International Airport (Chicago, IL)
- Washington Dulles International Airport (Chantilly, VA)
- LaGuardia Airport (New York, NY)
- John F. Kennedy International Airport (New York, NY)
- Minneapolis St. Paul International Airport (Minneapolis, MN)
- Newark International Airport (Newark, NJ)
- Detroit Metro Wayne County Airport (Detroit, MI)
- Ft. Lauderdale/Hollywood Airport (Ft. Lauderdale, FL)
- San Francisco International Airport (San Francisco, CA)
- General Edward Lawrence Logan International Airport (Boston, MA)
- Dallas/Fort Worth International Airport (Dallas/Fort Worth, TX)
- San Diego International Airport/Lindbergh Field (San Diego, CA)

As of 2016, Eurocontrol had deployed RWSL at one facility; Charles de Gaulle Airport in Paris.

== See also ==
- Advanced Surface Movement Guidance and Control System
