= TEC =

TEC or Tec may refer to:

== Education ==
- Trichy Engineering College, in Konalai, Tamil Nadu, India
- Costa Rica Institute of Technology
- Tec, the Monterrey Institute of Technology and Higher Education
- Tertiary Education Commission (disambiguation)
- Texas Eastern Conference, an American junior college athletic conference

== Governmental and public organizations ==
- Tasmanian Electoral Commission, Australia
- The Episcopal Church
- The ePlane Company, Indian aerospace company
- The Exploration Company, European aerospace company
- Telecommunication Engineering Centre, an Indian government agency
- Toshiba TEC Corporation, a subsidiary of Toshiba
- Tsunami Evaluation Coalition
- Transatlantic Economic Council, directs economic cooperation between the US and the EU
- Training and enterprise council, former public bodies in th UK
- Topographic Engineering Center, former name of the US Army Geospatial Center
- Treaty establishing the European Community
- Transitional Executive Council, historic South African organization

== Military ==
- TEC-3 or Technician third grade, United States Army rank
- TEC-4 or Technician fourth grade, United States Army rank
- TEC-5 or Technician fifth grade, United States Army rank
- I.G. Brown Air National Guard Training and Education Center, Knoxville, Tennessee

== People ==
- Nechama Tec, Professor Emerita at the University of Connecticut
- Roland Tec, American writer and movie director

== Science, engineering and medicine ==
- TEC (gene), a human gene
- Thermoelectric cooler, devices employing the Peltier effect
- Time error correction
- Transient erythroblastopenia of childhood, a medical condition
- Threshold Exceeds Condition, a value used in computer hard disk evaluation
- Total electron content, a descriptive quantity of the Earth's ionosphere
- TEC, a Russian abbreviation for thermal power stations in Russia and Soviet Union with combined heat and power plant

== Other uses ==
- Tech (river) (Catalan: Tec), Pyrénées-Orientales département, France
- TEC-9, a semi-automatic pistol
- Tec (album), a 2023 album by Lil Tecca
- SV TEC, a Dutch association football club
- Terik language (ISO 639-3 code: tec), spoken in Kenya
- Tower en route control, a collection of air-traffic routes
- TRACE Expert City, an office complex in Sri Lanka
- Transport En Commun, a brand name of Belgian transport company Société Régionale Wallonne du Transport
- Turkish Engine Center, an aircraft engine maintenance and repair shop
- TEC, a character in Paper Mario: The Thousand-Year Door
