= FISO =

FISO may refer to:

- Flight information service officer
- Italian Orienteering Federation (Italian: Federazione Italiana Sport Orientamento; FISO)
- World Obstacle, officially Fédération Internationale de Sports d’Obstacles (FISO) in French
