= ICAS =

ICAS may refer to:

- Ilahia college of Arts and Science, India
- Immaculate Conception Apostolic School, a former boys' boarding school in Center Harbor, New Hampshire
- Institute of Chartered Accountants of Scotland
- Institute for China-America Studies
- Institute of Contemporary Asian Studies at Temple University, Japan Campus
- International Cooperation on Airport Surveillance, headquartered in Zurich, Switzerland
- International Council of the Aeronautical Sciences
- International Council of Arbitration for Sport, the organisation that runs the Court of Arbitration for Sport
- Isolated congenital asplenia, a disease
