= Flight information service =

Form of air traffic service

A flight information service (FIS) is a form of air traffic service which is available to any aircraft within a flight information region (FIR), as agreed internationally by ICAO.

It is defined as information pertinent to the safe and efficient conduct of flight, and includes information on other potentially conflicting traffic, possibly derived from radar, but stopping short of providing positive separation from that traffic.

Flight Information also includes:

- Meteorological information
- Information on aerodromes
- Information on possible hazards to flight

FIS shall be provided to all aircraft which are provided with any air traffic control (ATC) service or are otherwise known to air traffic service units. All air traffic service units will provide an FIS to any aircraft, in addition to their other tasks.

== Aerodrome Flight Information Service ==
In most countries, an Aerodrome Flight Information Service (AFIS) is provided at airfields where, despite not being busy enough for full air traffic control, the traffic is such that some form of service is necessary. It can be seen as a half-way house between an uncontrolled and controlled airfield: As a part of the FIS, the AFIS provides pilots of aircraft with details of other known traffic taking off, landing and flying in the vicinity of the airfield.

=== Airspace ===
AFIS is provided at the aerodrome and in the surrounding airspace. The airspace in the immediate vicinity of the aerodrome is internationally called TIZ – Traffic Information Zone (some nations have other words and abbreviates e.g. the UK as seen below). The traffic information zone is equivalent to the controlled aerodromes CTR – control zone. Above the TIZ most AFIS aerodromes have a TIA – Traffic Information Area equivalent to the controlled aerodromes TMA. The TIZ and TIA are most commonly airspace classification G but with the additional regulation of mandatory two-way radio communication., commonly called G+. In some nations the airspace classification F is also used.

=== Service ===
The AFIS officer (abbreviated AFISO) provides flight information service including, traffic information, meteorological information, information on runway state and other information useful for the safe and efficient conduct of flight. The pilot must use this information and make up his own mind about certain aspects e.g. flight route. In TIZ and TIA the pilots are responsible for separation to other flights based on the information given by the AFISO.

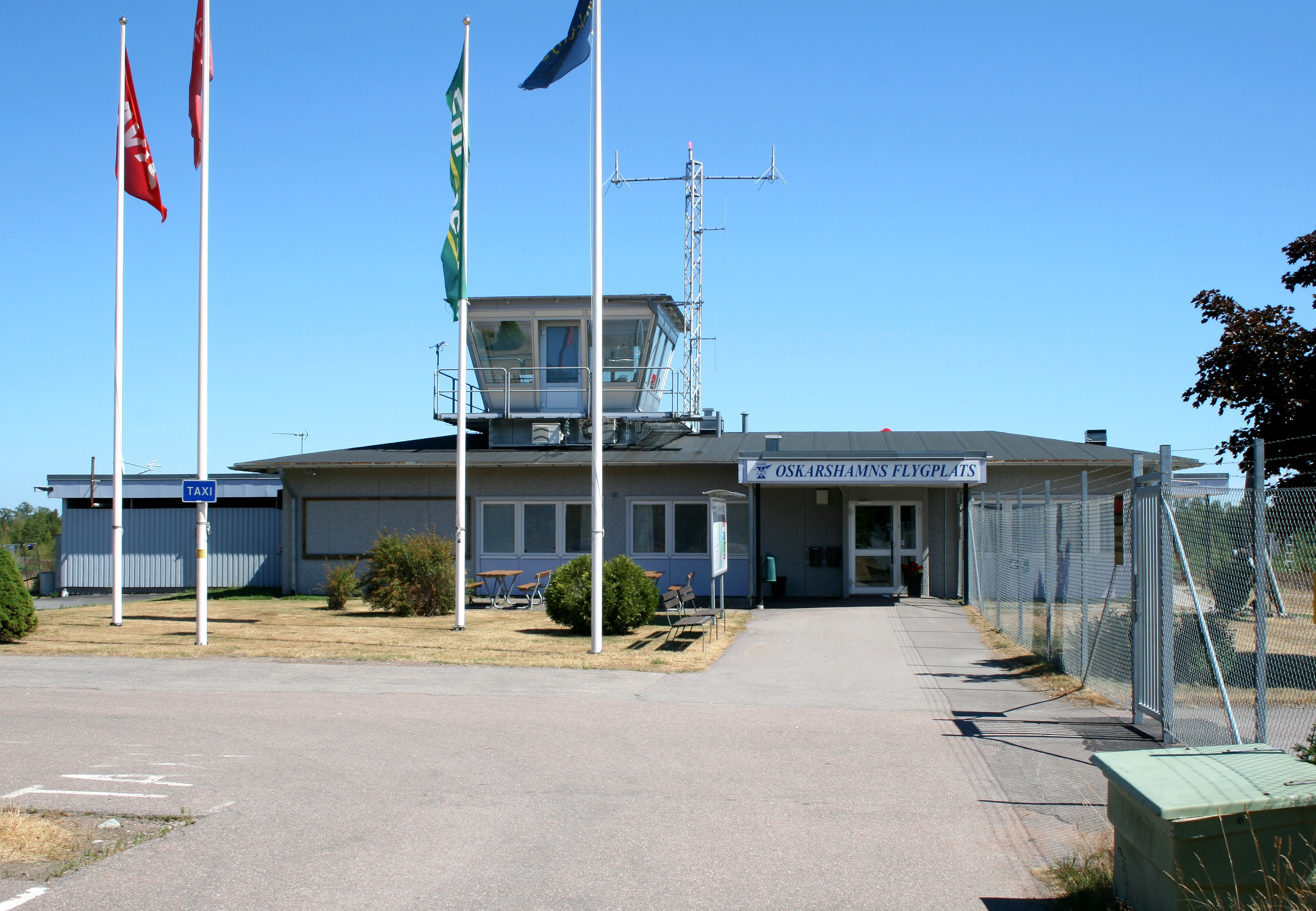
Oskarshamn AFIS Sweden

AFIS airports most commonly are not equipped with radar, although there are those that have it (e.g. in Denmark and Norway). It is therefore of utmost importance that the pilots call in and give accurate position reports so that the AFISO can relay appropriate traffic information.

=== Traffic ===
How much traffic an aerodrome can have and still be an AFIS aerodrome is not internationally regulated and is subject to national regulation by the relevant CAA. The amount of traffic at AFIS aerodromes can vary depending subject to national requirements, as well as the type of traffic in the airspace. In some countries only VFR flights are allowed, but in many IFR, VFR, military and others are allowed. There are no international restrictions on what types of flight an AFIS aerodrome can service.

=== Regulation ===
AFIS is not internationally regulated like Air traffic control is by ICAO. However, Eurocontrol have issued a recommendation called Eurocontrol manual for AFIS. Since there is no international regulation, AFIS is subject to national regulation by the relevant CAA.

=== AFIS around the world ===
AFIS is provided at airfields and aerodromes all over the world.

=== International Flight Information Service Association ===
Formed in September 2015, IFISA is an umbrella organisation for all national associations/unions/trade unions which represent AFIS or FIS operators. 28 Nations are already involved, with the aim of working with ICAO and EASA to improve the FIS service worldwide.

=== UK ===
In the UK this service is provided by a licensed Flight Information Service Officer (FISO), who has been validated at the particular Aerodrome, using the callsign suffix "Information". The authority of an FISO providing a service at an aerodrome resembles a fully qualified controller for aircraft taxiing, but only extends to the provision of an FIS to aircraft landing, taking-off or in flight, within the Area of Responsibility (i.e. the Aerodrome, and Air Traffic Zone (ATZ)).

All UK FISO units are members of the Association of UK FISO's.

=== Training ===
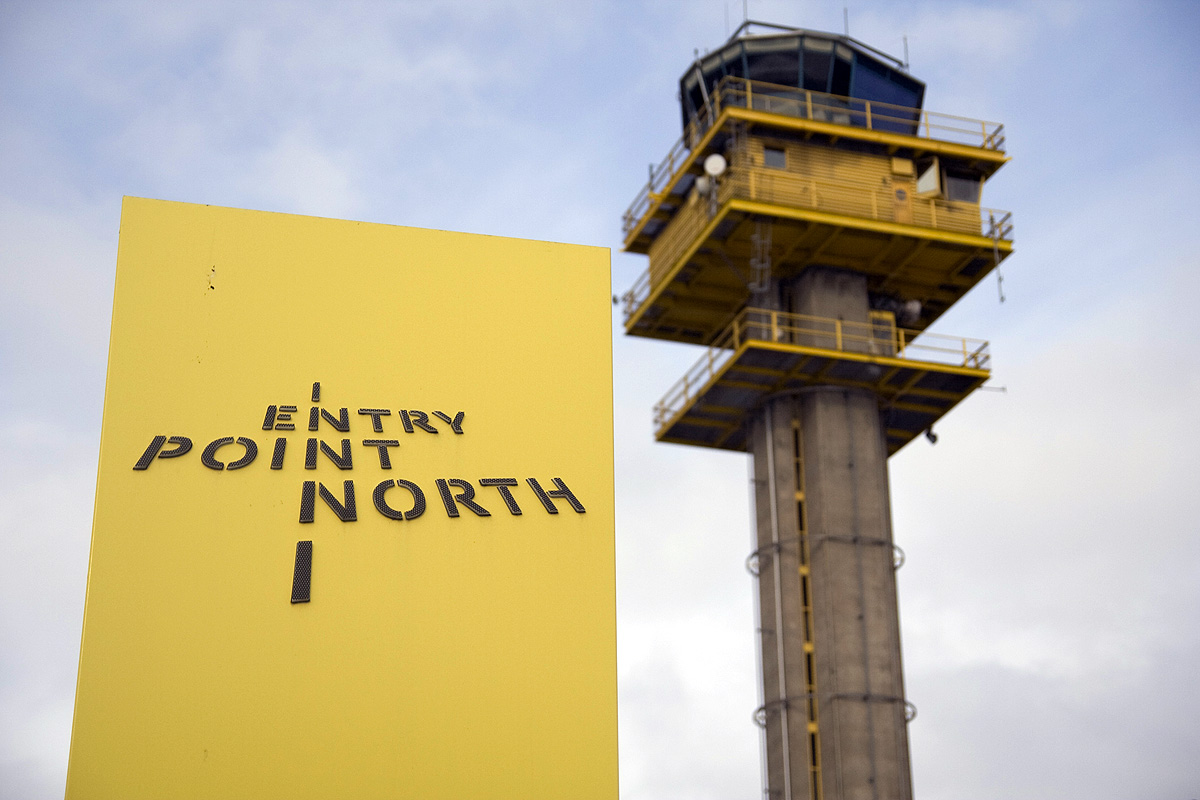
EPN - Entry Point North international ATM academy

The training to become an AFISO is not internationally regulated and is subject to national CAA legislation. However, there is one international academy providing AFIS training approved in many European nations. The academy located in Sweden at Malmö Airport called EPN – Entry Point North. EPN provides AFIS training with and without radar as well as refresher training, continuation training and development training. The basic school training is approximately 13 weeks long and needs to be followed by national training and unit training.

=== Dedicated Flight Information frequencies ===
Any particular FIR will often have one or more dedicated FIS frequencies where aircraft can make first contact for information. The quality of the information that such frequencies can give is tempered by the large geographical area that they cover, and in some more sparsely populated FIRs the frequencies are often not staffed. An FIS might suggest that aircraft contact a more suitable frequency, e.g., a local airport's radar unit, should that unit be in a position to provide a better service. These units often use the callsign suffix "Information".

In some countries, including the United States, an FIS is provided by units known as flight service stations (FSS). The related implementation of flight information service is commonly known as UNICOM, but in some situations, this service is provided by the primary FSS frequency (callsign RADIO), in addition to which a few U.S. airports now also have bespoke AFIS services, but this is implemented as a recording similar to ATIS and AWOS, not a live service.
