= International Cooperation on Airport Surveillance =

International Cooperation on Airport ATM Systems
- ICAS

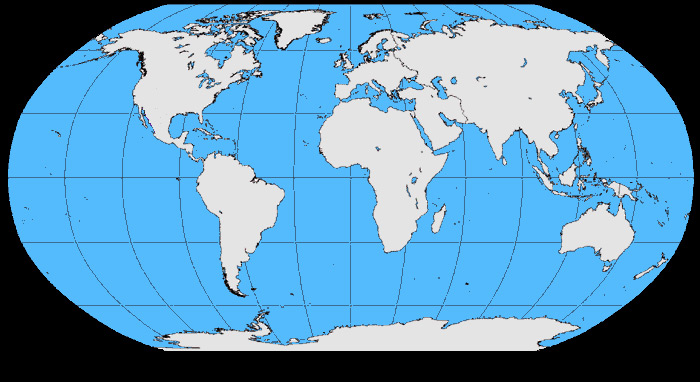
- zone of influence
- Abbreviation: ICAS
- Formation: 2001
- Purpose: Knowledge exchange
- Headquarters: Budapest HUNGARY
- Region served: Worldwide
- Members: Airports, Air Navigation Service Providers
- Official language: En
- Chairman of the Group / Secretary: Csaba GERGELY / Peter SZALOKY
- Main organ: Meetings / Forum
- Staff: 5
- Volunteers: 116
- Website: www.icas-group.org

The International Cooperation on Airport ATM Systems (ICAS) is a group of Airports, Air Navigation Service Providers (ANSPs) and EUROCONTROL.

Knowledge exchange is the key to success

== Scope ==
The scope of the ICAS group is to support Airports, ANSPs and other organisations in the implementation, integration and exploitation of Airport Surveillance Systems in an Airport environment, covering all phases of the ground movement.

The group also dialog with the Regulatory Authorities, Research and Development Institutes (R&D) and the industry.

The focus is currently on all aspects of A-SMGCS and supporting airport surveillance systems, including camera based Visual Surveillance technologies applied by Remote Tower operations. Individual meetings focus on drone detection. This is seen as the most promising approach to support safe and efficient traffic at Airports.

In ICAS Project Managers, Engineers and Air Traffic and Apron Controllers meet and discuss Airport Surveillance issues. The Members exchange experiences with different technologies, procedures and infrastructural constraints.

Currently representatives from 42 ANSPs, EUROCONTROL and Airport authorities are ICAS members, covering 28 countries.

Many more Organisations are expressing interest in the work of ICAS and it is believed, that the number of members will increase in the coming years. The next step for ICAS is to communicate its experiences with the authorities (EUROCONTROL, ICAO), organizations (IFATSEA etc.) and industry to help meet the users requirements in the system development and regulations.

== Goals ==
The goals of the ICAS group are:

- Exchange technical and operational issues, experiences and information, e.g.
- Requirements
  - Evaluation reports
  - Quality measurement methodology
  - Safety regulations
  - Proposals for common procedures, practices and standards (e.g. display, maintenance)
  - Maintenance: contracts, organizations (use of best practice)
  - Experiences with the industry
- Supporting members in different aspects, e.g. Evaluation of tenders, Site Acceptance Tests
- Initiate bilateral or multilateral forms of cooperation on various Aerodrome Surveillance related subjects.
- Give feedback and recommendations to international legislation organisations e.g. ICAO, EUROCONTROL
- Facilitate agreements regarding purchase and further development of A-SMGCS systems
- Promote Airport Safety aspects of A-SMGCS
- Dialog with other relevant organizations, e.g. International Federation of Air Traffic Safety Electronics Associations (IFATSEA)
- Be aware of future developments

== Meetings ==
The group meets three times per year throughout Europe.

The spring meetings are usually for members of the ICAS group.

The winter and summer meetings offer in addition to the regular work time slots for presentations and discussions with the Industry, R&D Institutes etc. Those time slots can be used to demonstrate new products and system enhancements, as well giving the members the opportunity to question the suppliers on system limitations. Those opportunities should not be used as a “trade show”, rather than a possibility to get feedback from the members.

Due to time limitations only a limited number of industry representatives will be invited to each meeting. Representatives from R&D and academic institutes will be invited as guests by the chairman of the ICAS group as well.

== Publications ==
The group will provide information on a WEB site www.icas-group.org which informs about ICAS group activities etc. From this WEB site links to industry WEB sites could also be installed.
