= Potomac Consolidated TRACON =

Air traffic control facility in Warrenton, Virginia

Coordinates: 38.7478°N 77.6703°W

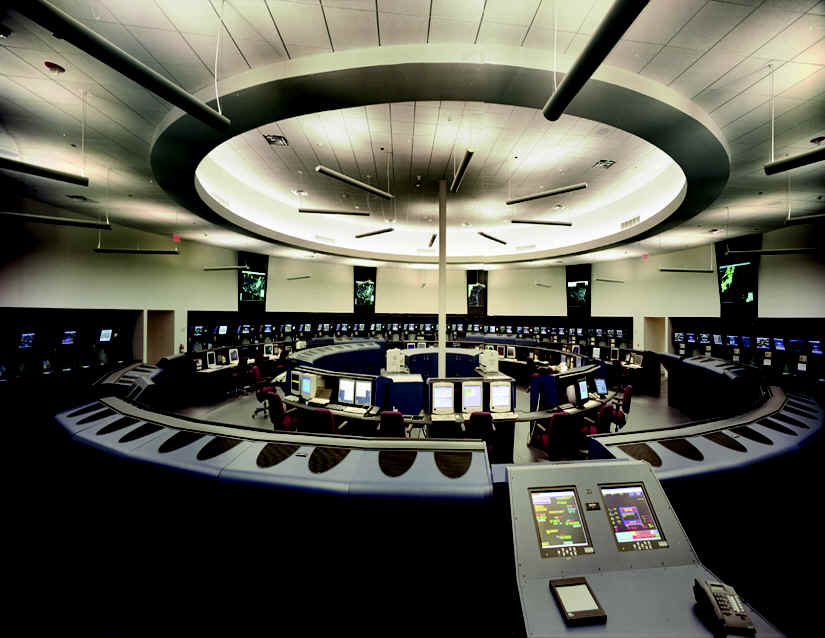
Potomac Consolidated TRACON

Potomac TRACON (PCT, radio communications: Potomac Approach and Potomac Departure) is a terminal radar approach control (TRACON) facility in charge of the Washington, D.C. airspace, Washington Special Flight Rules Area, the Baltimore area airspace and the Richmond-Charlottesville area airspace. It is based in Warrenton, Virginia. Potomac TRACON is the fourth largest TRACON in the United States, handling 1,400,659 aircraft operations in 2024.

PCT is a consolidation of 4 former TRACON facilities controlling air traffic for the region's 4 major airports: Washington Dulles International Airport, Ronald Reagan Washington National Airport, Baltimore-Washington International Airport, and Richmond International Airport. PCT is organized into 4 areas, still associated with those geographic regions:

- Shenandoah (SHD) covers Dulles and the west area of PCT
- Mount Vernon (MTV) covers the Reagan National Airport, Joint Base Andrews, and surrounding region
- Chesapeake (CHP) covers BWI and the northern area of PCT
- James River (JRV) covers Richmond and the southern area of PCT
