= Saab Sensis Corporation =

Corporation developing air traffic systems

- Industry: Air Traffic Management
- Founded: 1985
- Headquarters: East Syracuse, New York
- Key people: Mike Gerry, President
- Parent: Saab AB
- Website: http://saab.com/region/north-america/saab-sensis/

Saab Sensis Corporation is a technology company based in East Syracuse, New York and is a subsidiary of Saab Group. Saab Sensis, formerly Sensis Corporation, was acquired by Saab Group in 2011. Following the acquisition, Saab consolidated its U.S. defense businesses under a new U.S.-based company named Saab Defense and Security USA (SDAS) leaving Saab Sensis to focus on air traffic solutions. Today, Saab Sensis leads Saab's global Air Traffic Management business with primary offices in Australia, the Netherlands, Sweden, and the U.S.

In 2011, Saab Sensis commissioned the 35th ASDE-X system for the FAA. ASDE-X combines surface movement radar, multilateration and Automatic Dependent Surveillance – Broadcast (ADS-B) surveillance to provide air traffic controllers with highly accurate, real-time position and identification information of aircraft and vehicles on the airport surface.

Saab's Remote Tower is used by Sweden's LFV, who became the world’s first air navigation service provider to manage an airport remotely when it started remote tower services at Örnsköldsvik Airport in 2015.
