= RMCDE =

SuRveillance Message Conversion and Distribution Equipment for Air Traffic Control

- Developer(s): Eurocontrol
- Stable release: v5.90q1 / 2013
- Operating system: iRMK, Linux
- Type: Surveillance Date Distribution System
- License: Eurocontrol License - Software available on request
- Website: EUROCONTROL SDDS Website

RMCDE (SuRveillance Message Conversion and Distribution Equipment) is the name of a system designed to distribute the surveillance information to a community of user systems.

A user of surveillance data in a general sense is defined in this context as any Air Traffic Control (ATC) subsystem having a requirement to receive at defined instants the best and most up-to-date position information for all air traffic of interest to this user (e.g. Operator Display System, Flight Data Processing System, ATC Tools, Flow-Control Management Units, Remote Terminal Maneuvering Area's, Military Units, etc.). The data can be originating from a surveillance sensor (e.g. radar, ADS-B receiver, Multi-lateration system) or a surveillance data processing system (e.g. ARTAS)

RMCDE is a Multibus II based multiprocessor system composed of a number of subsystems (processor and IO boards) connected through a parallel data bus.

In addition to its distribution function, the RMCDE offers additional capabilities to manage the surveillance data flow like data validation, conversion and filtering.

== RMCDE History ==
Until 1990, each ATC centre was serviced by a dedicated set of (local) radars. Radar data exchange was only done at a limited scale, one of the reasons being that the sensors were using proprietary, incompatible formats. An exception to this practice is the Eurocontrol Maastricht Upper Area Control Centre (MUAC). Designed from the beginning as an international centre handling only en-route traffic, it does not have its own sensors since the MUAC airspace was already sufficiently covered by the sensors of the 4 participating states (Belgium, Netherlands, Luxembourg and Germany).

In April 1990, the Ministers of Transport of the European Civil Aviation Conference (ECAC) launched the "En-route Strategy for the 1990s" - a multilateral strategy designed to ensure that, by the end of the century, Air Traffic Control capacity will match forecasted demand. This strategy drove an initial programme, EATCHIP - the European ATC Harmonisation and Integration Programme, developed and managed by Eurocontrol to undertake the progressive harmonisation and integration of Air Traffic Services throughout the ECAC area.

One of the key points in this strategy was to harmonise the data formats used in ATC data exchange. The format chosen for surveillance data was ASTERIX (All Purpose Structured Eurocontrol SuRveillance Information Exchange).

The combination of harmonisation, MUAC data needs and the emergence of computer network technology led the way to the development of a X.25 based surveillance data distribution network: RADNET.

== RMCDE Concept ==
The main component in RADNET is the RMCDE. It takes care of the data routing within the network and acts as a gateway between sensors and ATC users.

In the early days, the conversion of data from proprietary formats to the open ASTERIX format (and back) played a crucial role in the acceptance of ASTERIX. The conversion allowed a smooth transition toward the new standard.

The RMCDE is one of the first systems in the ATC domain that provided what now would be called publish/subscribe services. Each user connected to RADNET can subscribe to surveillance data provided by any of the other RMCDEs in the network. In order to cope with the limited bandwidth of network connections in those days, the RMCDE allows filtering and merging on the source node, so that only data which is of real interest is sent across the network. This gave a huge boost in the international exchange of surveillance data. Whereas this exchange initially was mainly used to get a seamless coverage, it is now becoming an important element in reducing the cost of air navigation service provision by sharing resources.

In an ATC centre the RMCDE is used as a front-end processor (i.e. the first system to be encountered by incoming surveillance data). This means that it also acts as a gatekeeper. It therefore has a number of capabilities to protect downstream systems. The surveillance data is checked according to a number of rules set in the ASTERIX standard and corrupted data is immediately discarded. The filter function, both static and dynamic (i.e. depending on load), ensures that downstream systems are not flooded by huge amounts of unnecessary data.

== RMCDE/RADNET Implementation Team (RIT) ==
The RADNET/RMCDE combination is not only a new technology that was introduced for surveillance data exchange. It is a complete service concept. In addition to the technology, a common implementation approach was developed, radar sharing agreements were drafted between states and EUROCONTROL established an organisational unit that was responsible for the day-to-day support of both the technological as well as the organisational aspects. The RIT is tasked with configuration management and coordination of activities related to RADNET and the support and development of technology that ensures the continuity of surveillance data distribution in the EUROCONTROL member states.

== RMCDE deployment ==
Although initially only intended for deployment at MUAC and the centres servicing MUAC (i.e. Amsterdam, Brussels, Düsseldorf and Bremen), more than 100 RMCDEs have been deployed in the ATC infrastructures of 18 Eurocontrol member states.

== Future developments ==
After more than 25 years of service the Multibus II based architecture can be considered as obsolete and the software is no longer compliant with modern regulations. Furthermore, the phasing out of the X.25 technology requires new solutions to be put in place for network communication. Therefore, Eurocontrol decided in 2008 to develop a successor, the SDDS (Surveillance Data Distribution System). The SDDS is fully in line with requirements set by the Single European Sky initiative from the European Union. SDDS is already operational in several EUROCONTROL member states. With the introduction of the SDDS, the RADNET will transition to SURNET which no longer has geographical limitations. The RIT will be renamed to SDDS Implementation, Maintenance and Operational Support Team (SIMOS).
