= Mobile Air Traffic Control Tower =

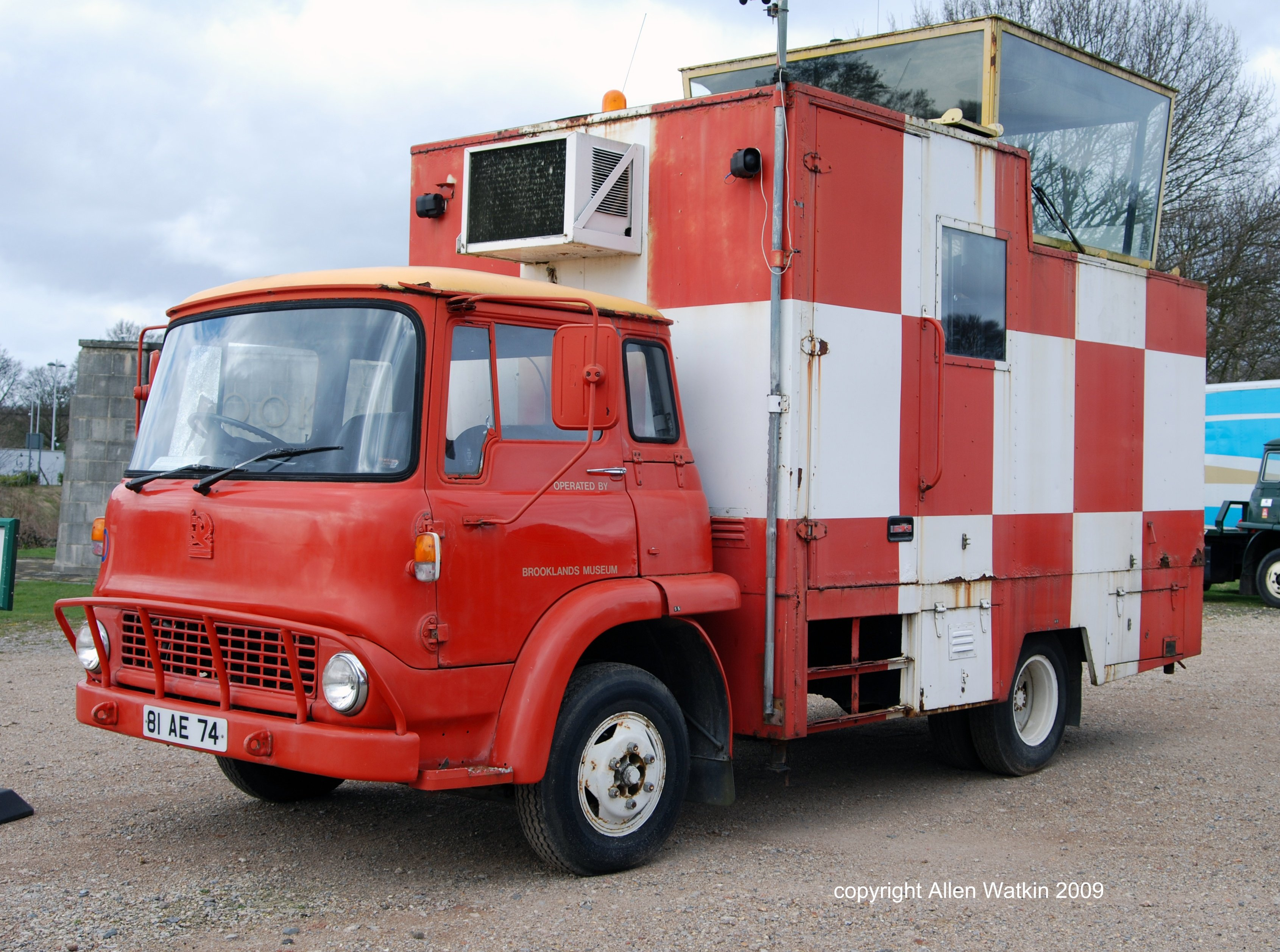
A British Mobile Air Traffic Control van

A mobile air traffic control tower (MATC) is an air traffic control (ATC) system that can move to temporary locations to service airfields. They are typically hosted on trucks or as temporary structures that can be assembled and dissembled for relocation. Despite what the name might imply, a mobile air traffic control tower can be a long-term installation, as they are less costly than a traditional ATC.

== Design ==
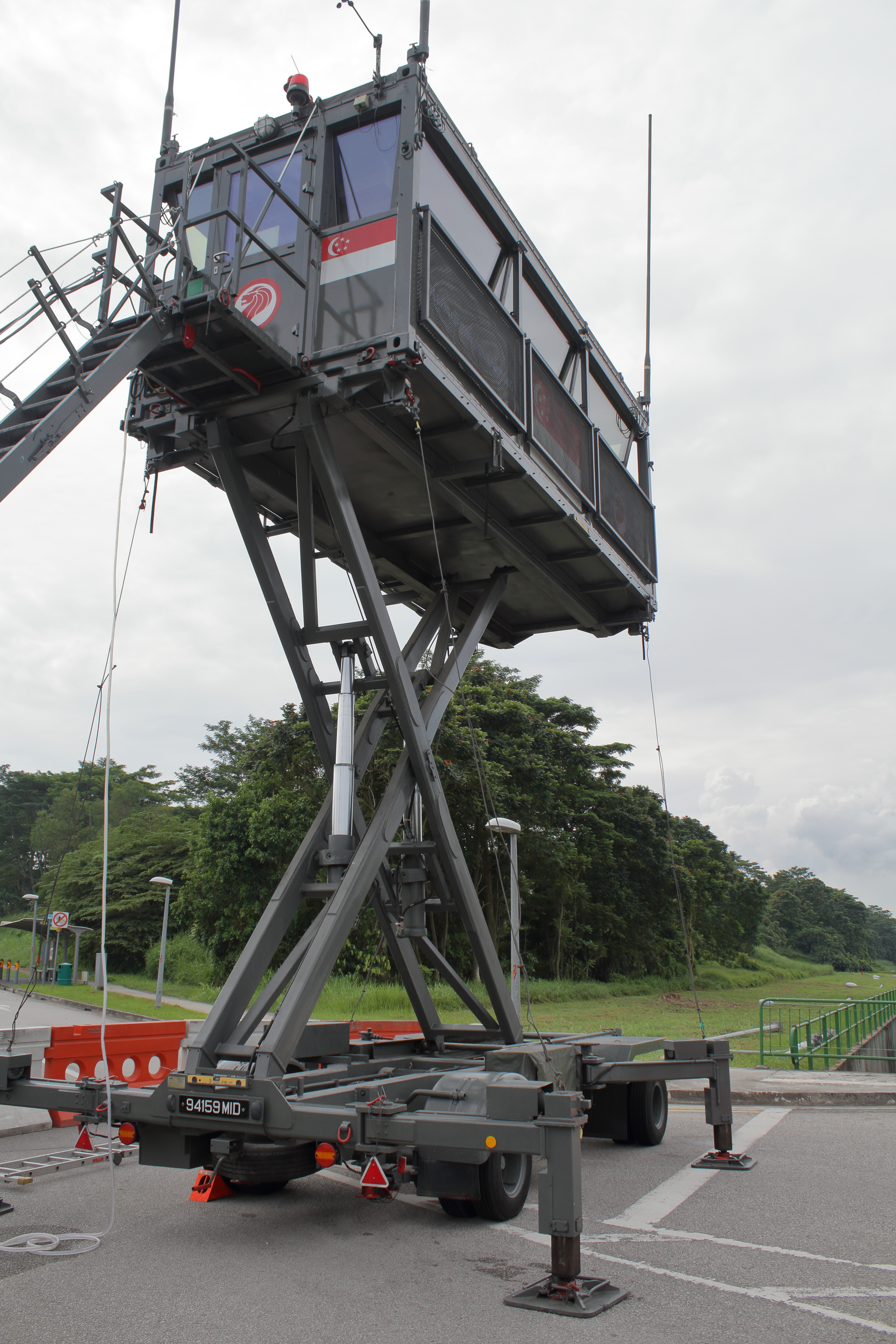
MATC scissor lift

As a result of their role in military operations, MATC systems are designed to be a self-sufficient ATC system that can be made operational in a short space of time. MATC systems are generally transportable by land, and can be drivable. They also are designed for easy disassembly and assembly and for transport by air and sea.

MATC towers can also be based around the idea of an aerial work platform, where the tower compartment raises above the trailer.

== Use ==
Mobile air traffic control towers are typically used in military airfields for military exercises, operations, small aerodromes, temporary ATC replacements, and relief operations.

They can be used in smaller airfields on a longer-term basis, as it would not be economically viable for a traditional ATC system to operate or be constructed in such a small case.

== See also ==
- Air traffic control
