= Surface movement radar =

Radar used to detect aircraft and vehicles on the surface of an airport

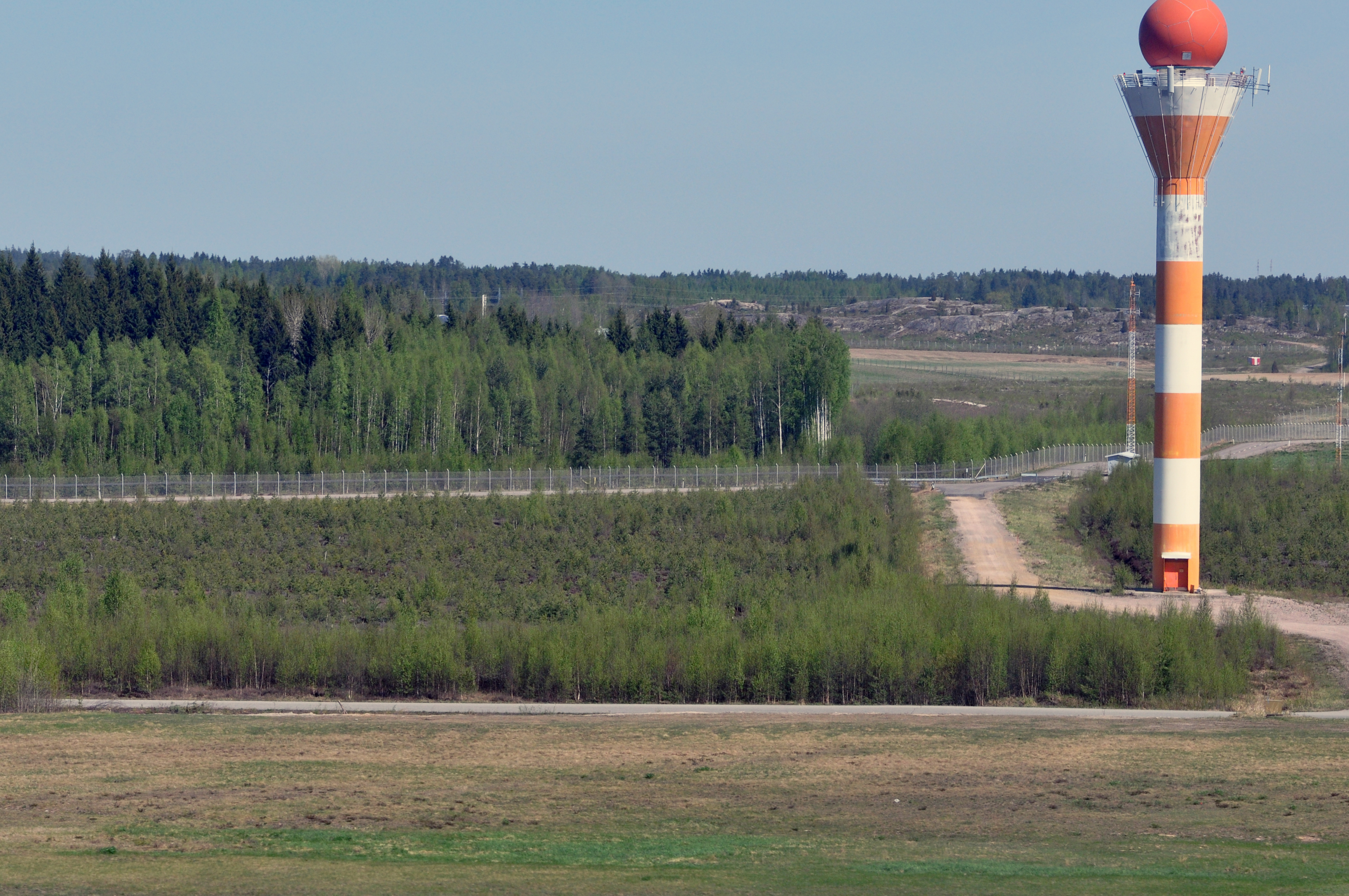
Surface movement radar tower at Helsinki Airport

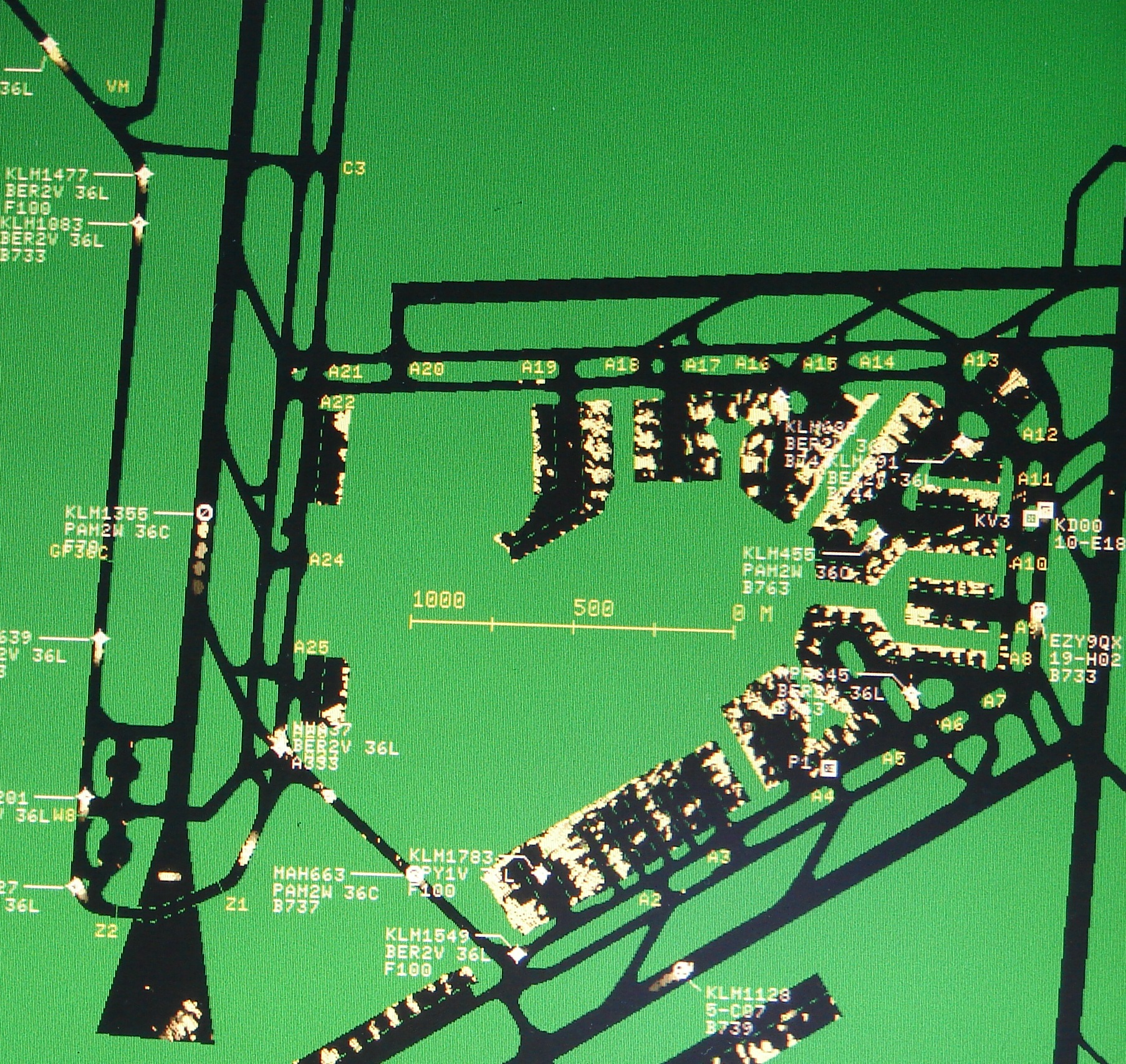
Display of the ground radar system at Amsterdam Airport Schiphol

Surface movement radar (SMR) is used to detect aircraft and vehicles on the surface of an airport. It is used by air traffic controllers to supplement visual observations. It may also be used at night time and during low visibility to monitor the movement of aircraft and vehicles. Surface movement radar is the term accepted by ICAO, but it has historically been known by other names such as ground movement radar, airport surface detection equipment (ASDE) and airfield surface movement indicator.

SMR is typically presented as a video blip, overlaid onto a plan view map of the airport showing features such as the runways and taxiways, grass areas and buildings. The SMR may be augmented by callsigns to identify each target, and provide warnings in the event of potential conflicts between aircraft on the runway (see AMASS). SMR also forms a key element of A-SMGCS.

SMR is required to provide high accuracy (typically 7.5 m), high update rate (1 per second), high resolution (less than 20 m) detection of airfield targets. To achieve this, SMR uses very short transmitter's pulse length of typically 40 nanoseconds. It uses a carrier-frequency in X-band (9 GHz) or K_{u}-band (15 to 17 GHz), and antennas with a very narrow beam (about 0.25 degrees in azimuth).
