= Flight information service officer =

Flight information service operator
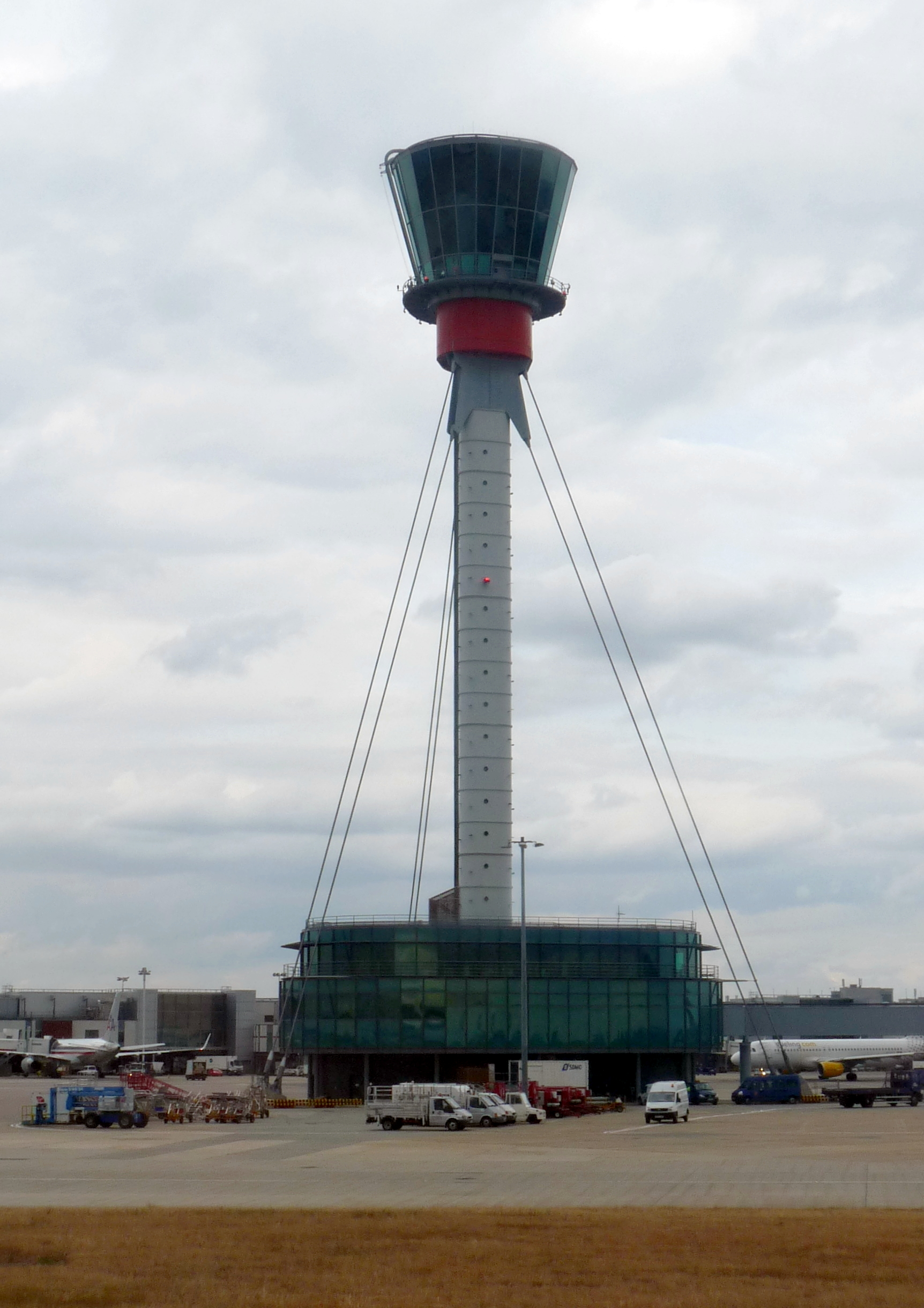
- Heathrow Control Tower

Occupation
- Occupation type: Profession
- Activity sectors: Aviation

Description
- Competencies: Excellent short-term memory and situational awareness, good communications skills and an excellent grasp of English
- Education required: Certification by Civil Aviation Authority
- Fields of employment: Civil Aviation at Airfields in the United Kingdom
- Related jobs: Air Traffic Control Operator

Flight information service operator or FISO, provide a flight information service (FIS) to any air traffic that requests it, or requires it. A FISO is a licensed operator, who most usually works at an aerodrome, although there are some FISOs working in area control centers. FISOs must been validated for each aerodrome, or other air traffic control unit they work for. Air traffic controllers are also permitted to provide flight information services to pilots.

== Features of the job (UK) ==
=== Salary ===
The average salary for a FISO in the United Kingdom in 2009 was approximately £20,000.

=== Core skills of a FISO ===
Communication is a vital part of the job: operators are trained to precisely focus on the exact words pilots and other controllers or FISOs use. As with controllers, FISOs communicate with the pilots of aircraft using a push-to-talk radiotelephony system, which has many attendant issues such as the fact only one transmission can be made on a frequency at a time, or transmissions will either merge or block each other and become unreadable.

Although local languages are sometimes used in ATC communications, the default language of aviation worldwide has been English since 5 March 2008, and in the United Kingdom, this is universal. As a result, flight information service operator require an excellent and fluent grasp of English. FISOs must be able to communicate without speech impediment or other disability which would cause inefficiency or inaccuracy of communication.

=== Area ===
FISOs working at an area control centre (ACC) will work from a dedicated position, providing FIS on a 'discrete frequency', as with their Aerodrome counterparts. I.E. a frequency other than the main air traffic control frequency.

=== Aerodrome or tower ===
FISOs most usually work in an aerodrome control tower, providing a flight information service to aircraft in the local area, and on the ground, and therefore require similar equipment and commanding views of an air traffic control tower at a quiet controlled aerodrome.

FISOs have the same powers as a controller to aircraft taxiing or stationary within the airport, when they are notified as being 'on watch', but may never provide commands to pilots in the air or on the runway(s). See flight information service for full details on the service provided.

=== Education and license ===
As a licensed occupation, flight information service operator are required to undertake testing to achieve their lifelong FISO license, issued by the Civil Aviation Authority (CAA). Potential FISOs will be required to undertake the following exams for their license to be issued and following these the license must be validated and maintained to be used:

Complete first page of application form SRG1414 Pass, law & procedures exam Pass, navigation & meteorogy exam for a FISO licence – subject to passing the exam Note: applicants also have to have an Aeronautical Radio Station Operator Certificate of Competence

==== Validation ====
Validation uses page 2 of the application form SRG1414, to apply for a validation examination by a CAA ATS inspector at a specific aerodrome, provided that a certified log of 40 hours 'hands-on' experience under supervision of a qualified operator, with a maximum of 4 hours in a day (see CAP427 Chap 2 Para 5.2), where no 'on the job' training prior to the issue of the FISO licence at will count towards the validity exam requirements. Upon passing the validity exam, a FISO will apply to the CAA for their FISO licence to be validated, against which the CAA can issue an Endorsement of the licence. This validation process is applicable to one airfield only. Upon moving to another unit, the validation process must be repeated.

==== Maintenance ====
To maintain the FISO license, requires some basic requirement to me met: Exercising the privileges of the licence at least once every 90 days A competence check every 24 months

In the event that a FISO fails a competence check, they will be immediately informed not to provide a flight information service, and steps will be taken by management, to provide re-training as necessary.

Only once a person has passed all these training stages, will they be able to provide a flight information service.

=== Age restrictions ===
All flight information service operators must be over the age of 18. Provided that they are medically and operationally sound, there is no upper age limit for a FISO.

== Other countries ==
=== Finland ===
Finland uses flight information service operator to run aerodrome flight information service aerodromes, similar to those in the United Kingdom, operated by FISOs.

=== Ireland ===
Ireland also uses flight information service operators, whose license expires every 2 years, similar to the license issued by the Civil Aviation Authority in United Kingdom.

=== Poland ===
Poland uses flight information service operators to provide radar information service for polish uncontrolled airspace (class G).

== See also ==
- Air safety
- Air traffic controllers' strike of 1981 (U.S.A.)
- Flight planning
- Air traffic controller
- Flight information service
