= Advanced Surface Movement Guidance and Control System =

Airport surveillance and control system

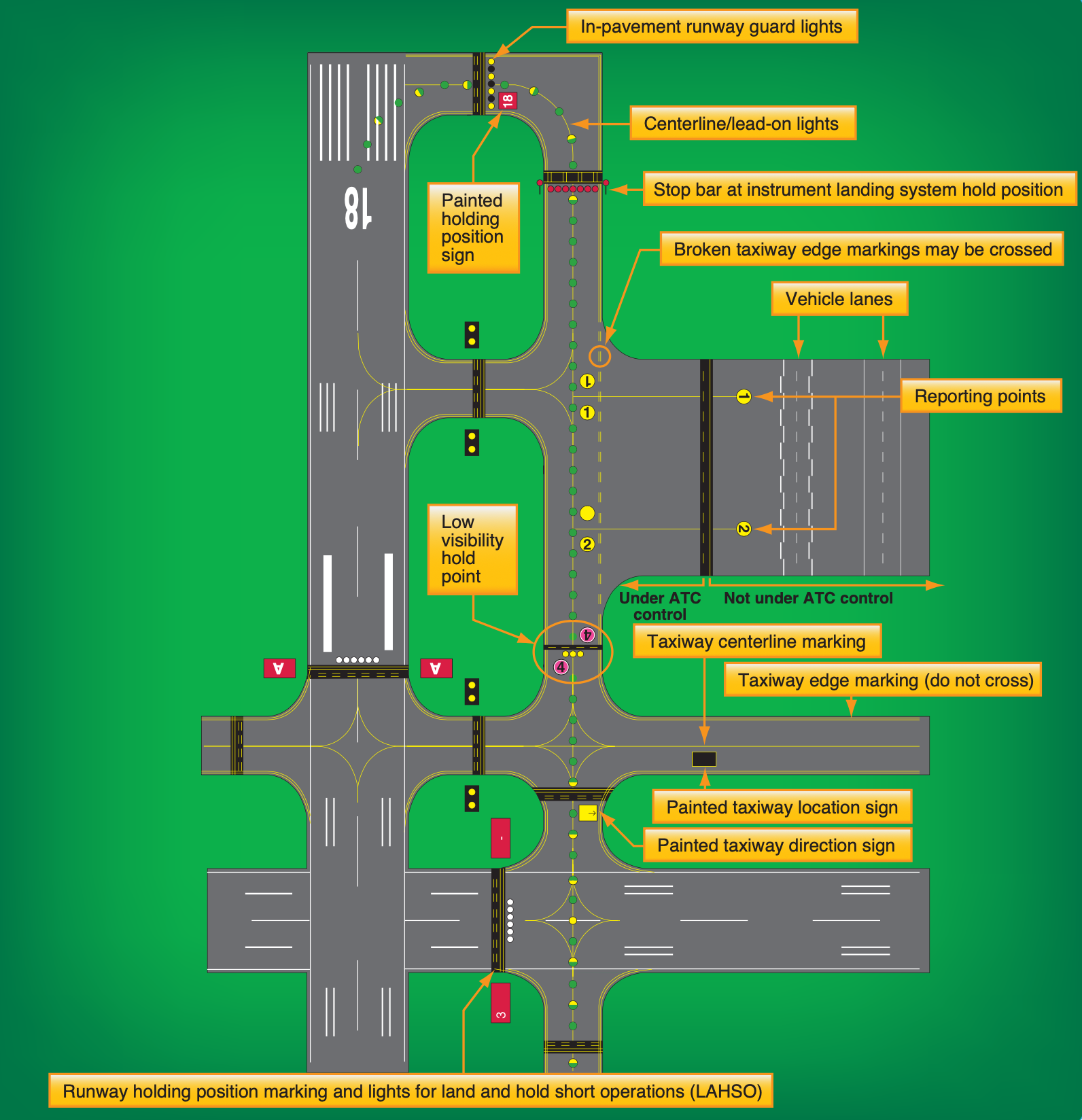
The SMGCS low visibility taxi plan includes the enhancement of taxiway and runway signs, markings, and lighting

Advanced Surface Movement Guidance and Control System is a system at airports having a surveillance infrastructure consisting of a Non-Cooperative Surveillance (e.g. SMR, Microwave Sensors, Optical Sensors etc.) and Cooperative Surveillance (e.g. Multilateration systems). A-SMGCS has 4 levels, level 1 and 2 have been validated by EUROCONTROL Airport Operations and Environment division in Eurocontrol located in Brussels, Belgium and work is ongoing to verify requirements for further implementation levels in coordination with ICAO, FAA etc. It uses the aircraft’s transponder transmission as the primary indication of airborne status.

== ICAO Definition ==
ICAO Doc 9830 defines A-SMGCS as follows:

Advanced surface movement guidance and control system (A-SMGCS). A system providing routing, guidance and surveillance for the control of aircraft and vehicles in order to maintain the declared surface movement rate under all weather conditions within the aerodrome visibility operational level (AVOL) while maintaining the required level of safety.

== Airports with FAA approved SMGCS plans ==
U.S. airports with FAA approved Low Visibility Operations / Surface Movement Guidance and Control Systems

OpSpec/Mspec/LOA C056/C078/C079 Updated – May 24, 2016

Airport ID	Airport	City	State	Region
ANC	Ted Stevens Anchorage International	Anchorage	AK	AAL
FAI	Fairbanks International	Fairbanks	AK	AAL
LIT	Bill and Hillary Clinton National / Adams Field	Little Rock	AR	ASW
FAT	Fresno Yosemite International	Fresno	CA	AWP
BFL	Meadows Field Airport	Bakersfield	CA	AWP
LAX	Los Angeles International	Los Angeles	CA	AWP
ONT	Ontario International	Ontario	CA	AWP
SFO	San Francisco International	San Francisco	CA	AWP
DEN	Denver International	Denver	CO	ANM
BDL	Bradley International	Windsor Locks	CT	AEA
IAD	Washington Dulles International	Washington	DC	AEA
TPA	Tampa International	Tampa	FL	ASO
ATL	Hartsfield - Jackson / Atlanta International	Atlanta	GA	ASO
DSM	Des Moines International	Des Moines	IA	ACE
BOI	Boise Air Terminal / Gowen Field	Boise	ID	ANM
ORD	Chicago O'Hare International	Chicago	IL	AGL
RFD	Chicago / Rockford International	Rockford	IL	AGL
FWA	Fort Wayne International	Fort Wayne	IN	AGL
IND	Indianapolis International	Indianapolis	IN	AGL
SDF	Louisville International - Standiford Field	Louisville	KY	ACE
MSY	Louis Armstrong New Orleans International	New Orleans	LA	ASW
BOS	General Edward Lawrence Logan International	Boston	MA	AEA
ACK	Nantucket Memorial	Nantucket	MA	AEA
ORH	Worcester Regional	Worcester	MA	AEA
BWI	Baltimore / Washington International Thurgood Marshall	Baltimore	MD	AEA
BGR	Bangor International	Bangor	ME	AEA
PWM	Portland International Jetport	Portland	ME	AEA
DTW	Detroit Metropolitan Wayne County	Detroit	MI	AGL
MSP	Minneapolis - St. Paul International / World-Chamberlain	Minneapolis	MN	AGL
MCI	Kansas City International	Kansas City	MO	ACE
STL	St. Louis Lambert International	Saint Louis	MO	ACE
GTF	Great Falls International	Great Falls	MT	ANM
CLT	Charlotte / Douglas International	Charlotte	NC	AEA
GSO	Piedmont Triad International	Greensboro	NC	AEA
RDU	Raleigh-Durham International	Raleigh	NC	AEA
OMA	Eppley Airfield	Omaha	NE	ACE
MHT	Manchester	Manchester	NH	AEA
EWR	Newark Liberty International	Newark	NJ	AEA
SWF	Stewart International	Newburgh	NY	AEA
CLE	Cleveland Hopkins International	Cleveland	OH	AGL
DAY	James M Cox Dayton International	Dayton	OH	AGL
ILN	Wilmington Air Park	Wilmington	OH	AGL
EUG	Mahlon Sweet Field	Eugene	OR	ANM
PDX	Portland International	Portland	OR	ANM
MDT	Harrisburg International	Harrisburg	PA	AEA
PHL	Philadelphia International	Philadelphia	PA	AEA
PIT	Pittsburgh International	Pittsburgh	PA	AEA
PVD	Theodore Francis Green State	Providence	RI	AEA
GSP	Greenville Spartanburg International	Greer	SC	ASO
FSD	Joe Foss Field	Sioux Falls	SD	AGL
TYS	McGhee Tyson	Knoxville	TN	ACE
MEM	Memphis International	Memphis	TN	ACE
BNA	Nashville International	Nashville	TN	ACE
AUS	Austin-Bergstrom International	Austin	TX	ASW
DFW	Dallas / Fort Worth International	Dallas	TX	ASW
AFW	Fort Worth Alliance	Fort Worth	TX	ASW
HOU	William P Hobby	Houston	TX	ASW
IAH	George Bush Intercontental / Houston	Houston	TX	ASW
SLC	Salt Lake City International	Salt Lake City	UT	ANM
RIC	Richmond International	Richmond	VA	AEA
SEA	Seattle-Tacoma International	Seattle	WA	ANM
GEG	Spokane International	Spokane	WA	ANM
MSN	Dane County Regional - Truax Field	Madison	WI	AGL
MKE	General Mitchell International	Milwaukee	WI	AGL

== See also ==
- Runway Awareness and Advisory System
- Airport surveillance and broadcast systems
- Follow the Greens
