= Communication, navigation and surveillance =

Air traffic management functions

Communication, navigation and surveillance (CNS) are the main functions that form the infrastructure for air traffic management, and ensure that air traffic is safe and efficient.

== Functions ==
The CNS has the following three main functions.

=== Communication ===
Communication, i.e. aviation communication, refers to communication between two or more aircraft, the exchange of data or verbal information between aircraft and air traffic control and the ground based communication infrastructure of the ATM network (like the aeronautical fixed service). For continental airspace, VHF (civil) and UHF (military) systems are used whereas for oceanic areas, high frequency systems and SATCOMs are used.

=== Navigation ===
Navigation, i.e. air navigation, refers to the process of planning, recording, and controlling the movement of an aircraft from one place to another by providing accurate, reliable and seamless position determination capability.

=== Surveillance ===
Surveillance systems are used by air traffic control to determine the position of aircraft. There are two types of surveillance systems:

==== Cooperative systems ====
Cooperative systems: Under this form of surveillance, systems on the ground (such as SSR) communicate with equipment (such as transponders) on board the aircraft to determine the position and other details of the aircraft. Aircraft information, which may include position from GNSS or other means is determined on board and then transmitted to ATC in response to interrogation. Other cooperative systems such as ADS-B rely on aircraft transmitting their position and other information without interrogation from the ground.

==== Non-cooperative systems ====
Non-cooperative systems: Under this form of surveillance, systems on the ground (such as PSR) are able to locate the aircraft and measure its position from the ground by transmitting pulses of radio waves which reflect off the aircraft's hull.

== See also ==
- Air traffic management
