= Tower en route control =

Collection of flight routes

In United States aviation, tower en route control (TEC) is an air traffic control program to provide a service to aircraft proceeding to and from metropolitan areas in short flights. It links designated approach control Areas by a network of identified routes made up of the existing airway structure of the National Airspace System.

== Overview ==
TEC routing is intended to better distribute the load of traffic coordination over different ATC facilities and levels by allowing low-altitude IFR traffic engaged in short flights within congested areas to conduct the entire flight under the control of approach-control or lower levels of ATC. Aircraft flying TEC routes can complete an entire flight without the need to contact major air traffic control centers. Prepared TEC routes have been published for turbojet and lighter aircraft between major airports within large and congested airspaces.

The maximum TEC service altitude is 10,000 ft (3,000 m).

== See also ==
- Instrument flight rules
