= Tertiary Education Commission =

Tertiary Education Commission may refer to:

- Tertiary Education Commission (New Zealand), which directs tertiary education in New Zealand
- The former Tertiary Education Commission, Mauritius; restructured in 2020 as the Higher Education Commission and Quality Assurance Authority, which direct tertiary education in Mauritius
