= Air traffic control =

Service to direct pilots of aircraft

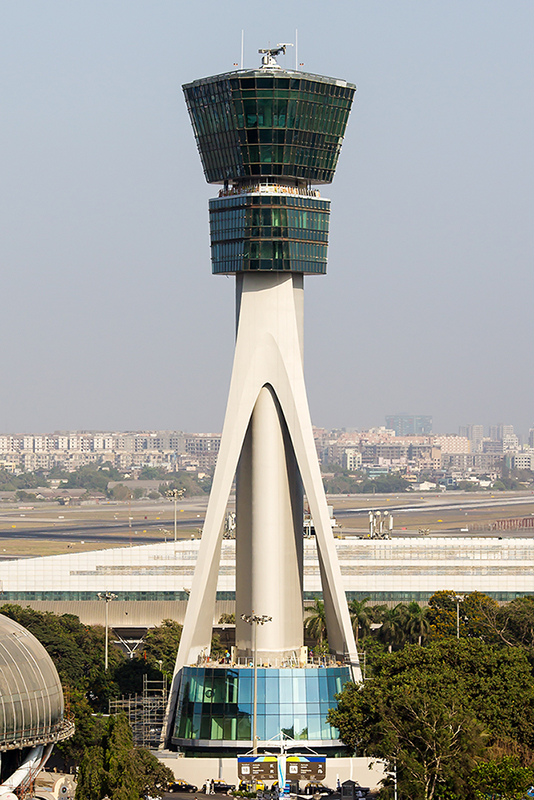
The air traffic control tower of Mumbai International Airport in India

Air traffic control (ATC) is a service provided by ground-based air traffic controllers who direct aircraft on the ground and through controlled airspace. The primary purpose of ATC is to prevent collisions, organise and expedite the flow of air traffic, and provide information and other support for pilots. In some countries, ATC can also provide advisory services to aircraft in non-controlled airspace. Controllers monitor the location of aircraft in their assigned airspace using radar and communicate with pilots by radio. To prevent collisions, ATC enforces traffic separation rules, which ensure each aircraft maintains a minimum amount of empty space around it. ATC services are provided to all types of aircraft, including private, military, and commercial flights. Depending on the type of flight and the class of airspace, ATC may issue mandatory instructions or non-binding advisories (known as flight information in some countries). While pilots are required to obey all ATC instructions, the pilot in command of an aircraft always retains final authority for its safe operation. In an emergency, the pilot may deviate from ATC instructions to the extent required to maintain the safety of the aircraft. Weather conditions, such as thunderstorms, strong winds, and low visibility, can significantly affect air traffic control operations, leading to delays, diversions, and the need for alternate routing.

== Language ==
According to requirements of the International Civil Aviation Organization (ICAO), ATC operations are conducted either in English, or the local language used by the station on the ground. In practice, the native language for a region is used; however, English must be used upon request.

== History ==
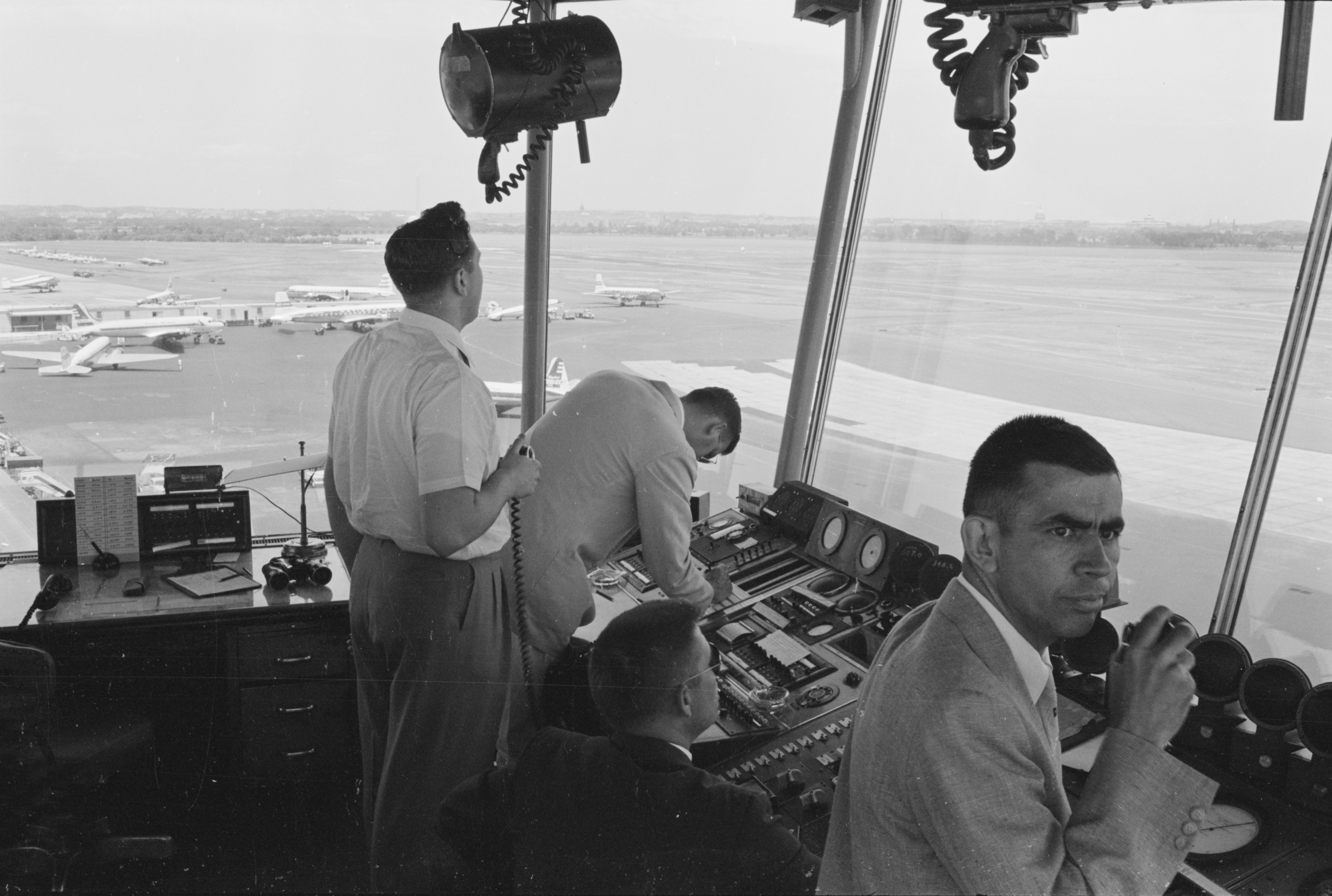
ATC staff at Washington National Airport's tower, 1958

In 1920, Croydon Airport near London, England, was the first airport in the world to introduce air traffic control. The 'aerodrome control tower' was a wooden hut 15 feet (5 metres) high with windows on all four sides. It was commissioned on 25 February 1920, and provided basic traffic, weather, and location information to pilots.

In the United States, air traffic control developed three divisions. The first of several air mail radio stations (AMRS) was created in 1922, after World War I, when the U.S. Post Office began using techniques developed by the U.S. Army to direct and track the movements of reconnaissance aircraft. Over time, the AMRS morphed into flight service stations. Today's flight service stations do not issue control instructions, but provide pilots with many other flight related informational services. They do relay control instructions from ATC in areas where flight service is the only facility with radio or phone coverage. The first airport traffic control tower, regulating arrivals, departures, and surface movement of aircraft in the U.S. at a specific airport, opened in Cleveland in 1930. Approach- and departure-control facilities were created after adoption of radar in the 1950s to monitor and control the busy airspace around larger airports. The first air route traffic control center (ARTCC), which directs the movement of aircraft between departure and destination, was opened in Newark in 1935, followed in 1936 by Chicago and Cleveland.

After the 1956 Grand Canyon mid-air collision, killing all 128 on board, the FAA was given the air-traffic responsibility in the United States in 1958, and this was followed by other countries. In 1960, Britain, France, Germany, and the Benelux countries set up Eurocontrol, intending to merge their airspaces. The first and only attempt to pool controllers between countries is the Maastricht Upper Area Control Centre (MUAC), founded in 1972 by Eurocontrol, and covering Belgium, Luxembourg, the Netherlands, and north-western Germany. In 2001, the European Union (EU) aimed to create a 'Single European Sky', hoping to boost efficiency and gain economies of scale.

In the USSR, the first air traffic control service was organized in 1929 on the Moscow - Irkutsk air route; in 1930, control areas were defined along all existing air routes.

== Airport traffic control tower ==
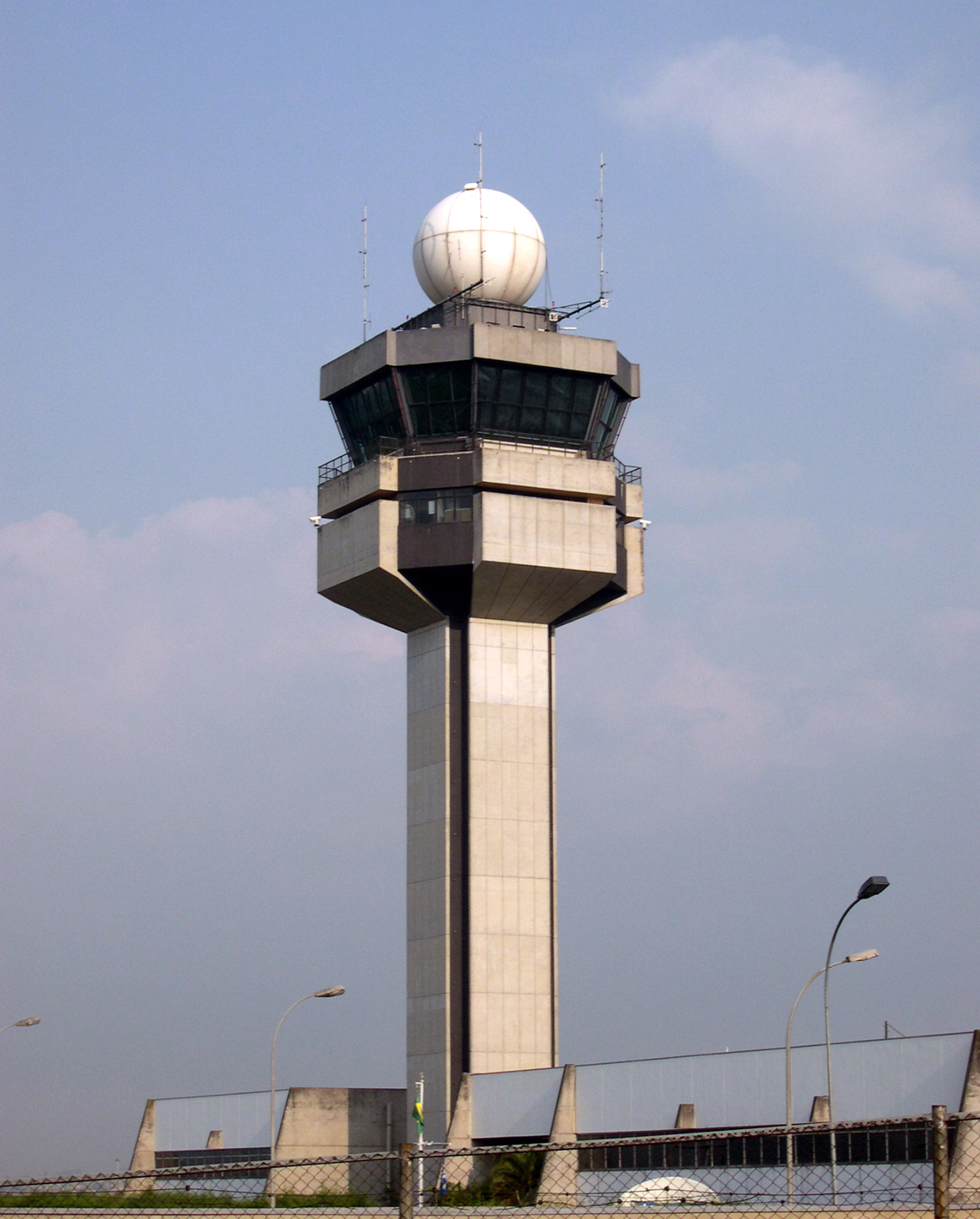
Control tower at São Paulo–Guarulhos International Airport

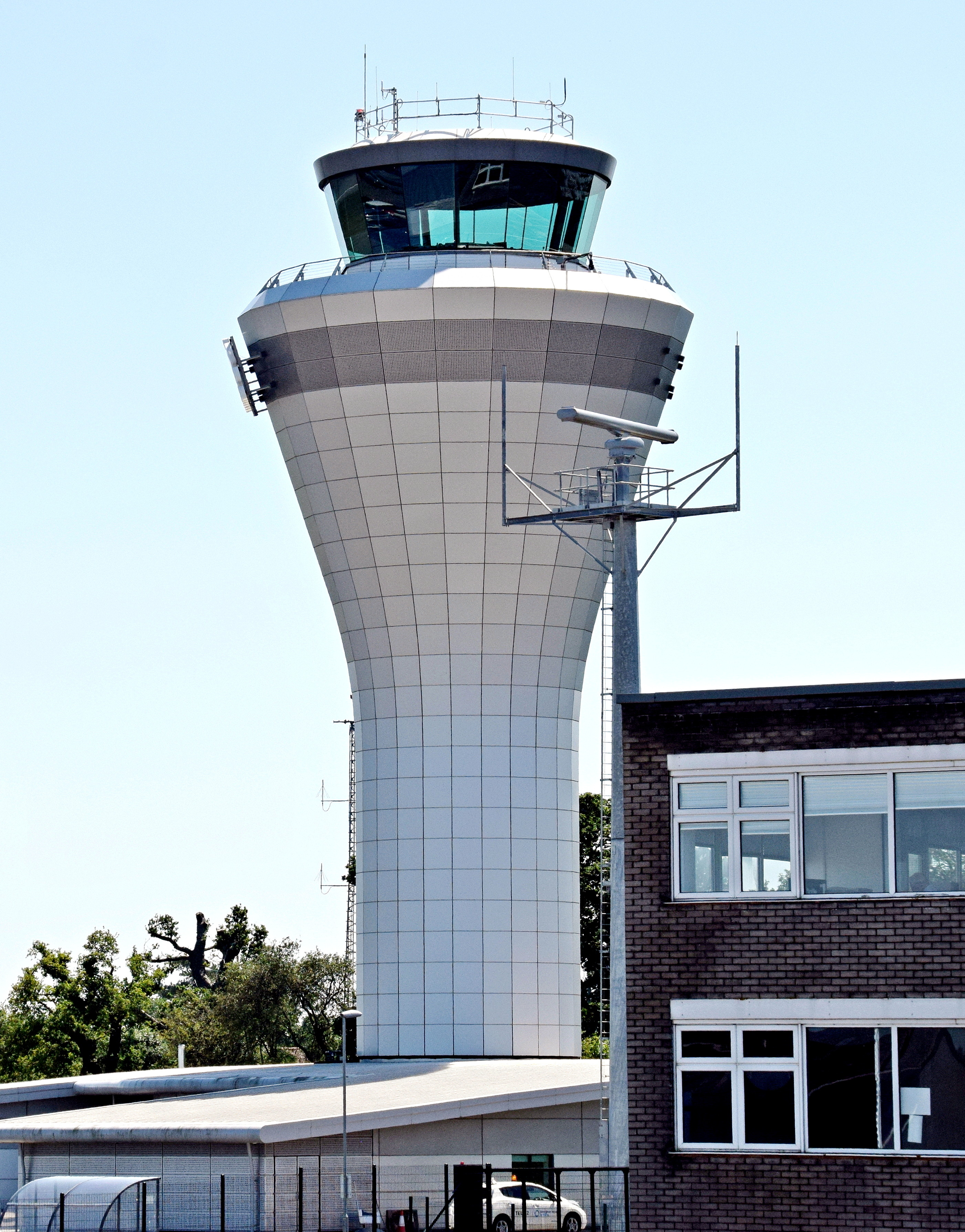
Control tower at Birmingham Airport, England

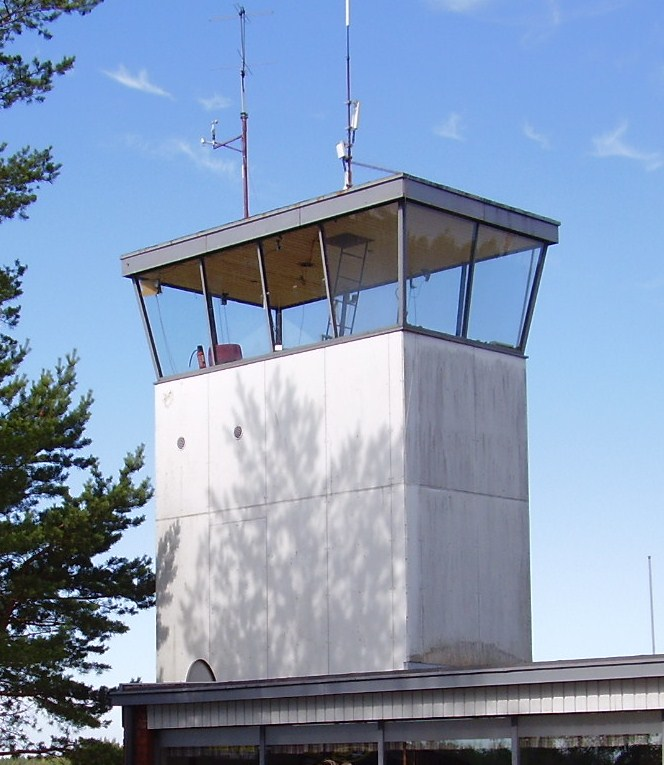
Small control tower at Räyskälä Airfield in Loppi, Finland

The primary method of controlling the immediate airport environment is visual observation from the airport control tower. The tower is typically a tall, windowed structure, located within the airport grounds.

Remote and virtual tower (RVT) is a system based on air traffic controllers being located somewhere other than at the local airport tower, and still able to provide air traffic control services.

=== Ground control ===
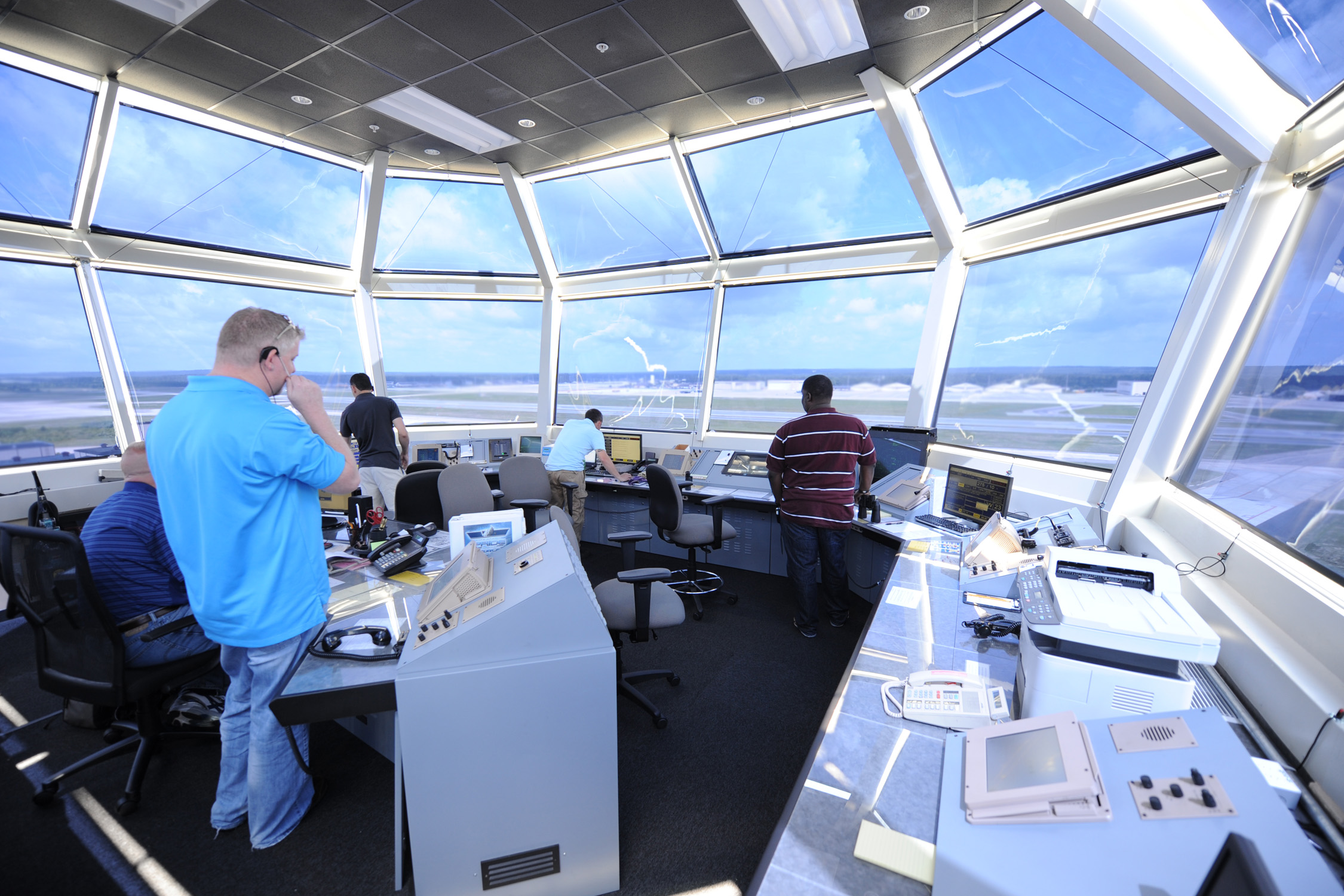
Inside Pope Field air traffic control tower

Ground control (sometimes known as ground movement control, GMC) is responsible for the airport movement areas.

Some busier airports have surface movement radar (SMR).

=== Flight data and clearance delivery ===
Clearance delivery is the position that issues route clearances to aircraft, typically before they commence taxiing. These clearances contain details of the route that the aircraft is expected to fly after departure.

=== Air control or local control ===
Air control (known to pilots as tower or tower control) is responsible for the active runway surfaces.

==== Analogous use ====
In the field of supply chain management, the concept of a "supply chain control tower" reflects the "end-to-end visibility" provided by an air traffic control tower. Ashutoch Gupta, writing for Gartner, observes that a supply chain control tower can be established "by combining people, process, data, organization and technology to improve visibility, control and decision making".

=== Airports without a control tower (mandatory frequency airport) ===
An airport with a mandatory frequency (MF), mandatory traffic advisory frequency (MTAF), mandatory broadcast zone (MBZ) or air ground communications service (AGCS) is an airport which does not have a control tower but still requires arriving and departing aircraft to communicate with other aircraft or a radio operator on a published frequency.

Mandatory frequency airports are rare in the United States, one example being Ketchikan International Airport (14 CFR 93.151), but they are common in other countries such as Canada, Australia, the United Kingdom and Norway; often, an MF or MTAF airport is one with scheduled passenger service but insufficient traffic to support a control tower.

If there is a flight service specialist monitoring the frequency, the specialist will give pilots advisories about traffic, weather, and surface conditions, and may relay IFR clearances from en route controllers, but do not give clearances. In the United Kingdom, weather and traffic information can be provided by radio stations named Air Ground Communications Services (AGCS). These similarly inform pilots who are then responsible for decisions made.

Some examples of MF airports in Canada include Kingston/Norman Rogers Airport and Kuujjuaq Airport.

== Approach and terminal control ==
Approach control, also known as terminal control, provides air traffic control services to arriving and departing flights. A facility that uses radar is a radar approach control facility.

A TRACON facility typically handles ascent and descent portions of a flight that are more distant from the airport than the take-off and landing handled by an airport control tower.

In the United States, a terminal radar approach control (TRACON) facility uses radar and air-ground communications to provide control services to aircraft arriving, departing, or transiting the airspace controlled by the facility. TRACON controllers typically handle the climb and descent portions of a flight beyond the immediate airport vicinity, typically (though not always) within a 40-mile radius, while airport tower controllers handle takeoff and landing within a few miles of the airport.

As of fiscal year 2024, the U.S. National Airspace System consisted of 121 TRACONs combined with airport control towers plus 25 standalone TRACONs.

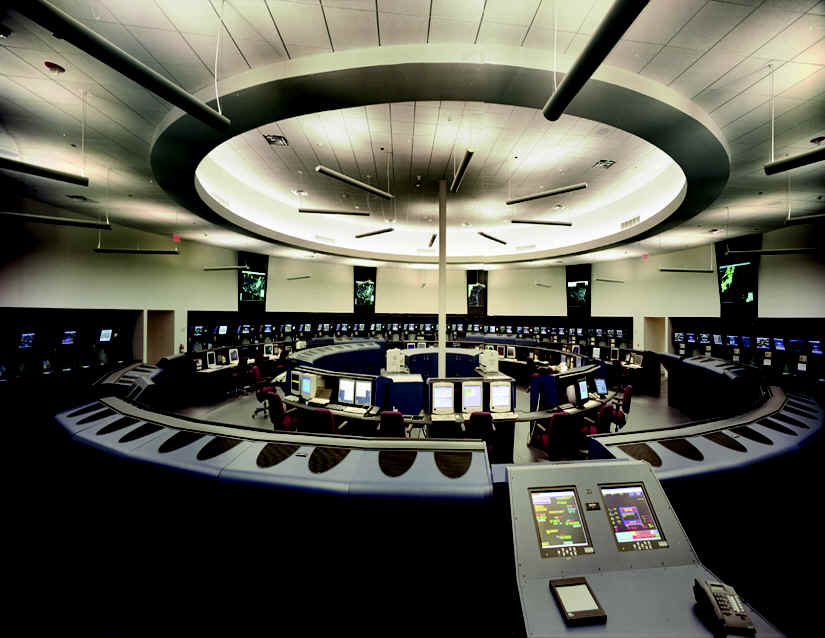
Potomac Consolidated TRACON, near Warrenton, Virginia, United States

A TRACON facility may serve multiple airports. For example, Potomac Consolidated TRACON (PCT) consolidated five previously separate TRACONs serving Baltimore, Reagan National, Dulles, Richmond, and Andrews Air Force base, a consolidation which allowed the FAA to redesign the region's airspace to provide more efficient and direct flight routes. U.S. TRACONs are identified with three-character alphanumeric codes. For example, Atlanta TRACON is designated A80, Chicago TRACON is C90, New York TRACON is N90, and Southern California TRACON is SCT.

Four U.S. facilities have combined the approach-control services of a TRACON with the wider-area en route services of an Air Route Traffic Control Center (ARTCC). These Combined Control Facilities (CCFs) are Honolulu (HCF); Guam (ZUA); San Juan, Puerto Rico (ZSU); and Joshua Control Facility (JCF) at Edwards Air Force Base.

== Area and en-route control ==
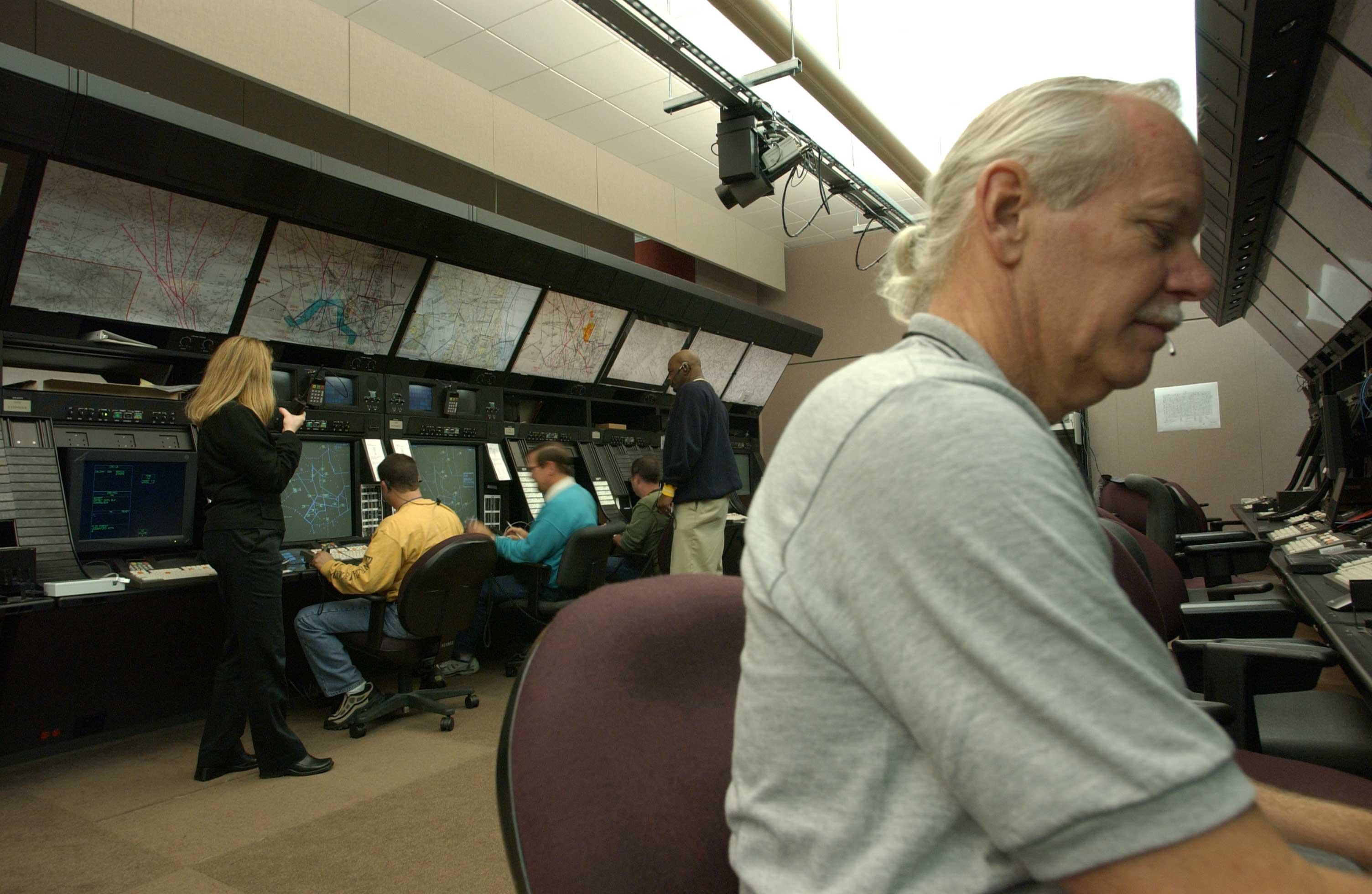
The training department at the Washington Air Route Traffic Control Center, Leesburg, Virginia, United States

An area control center (ACC), known in the U.S. as a "Center" or air route traffic control center (ARTCC), is an en route air traffic control center that primarily controls IFR traffic, or aircraft at high altitude flying by instruments, instead of aircraft that are landing or taking off. Each area control center is assigned a flight information region, and certain area control centers near the coast are also tasked with monitoring aircraft flying over the ocean. Area control is sometimes combined in a single facility with terminal control and performs duties to similar to terminal control, such as rerouting aircraft to deal with adverse conditions and directing the course of aircraft to ensure separation.

As of fiscal year 2024, the U.S. National Airspace System is coordinated through 21 Centers, plus 4 Combined Control Facilities (mentioned in the previous section). As of 2026, Eurocontrol coordinates 66 ACCs for 43 states.

== Air traffic controllers ==
Air traffic controllers in the U.S. are responsible for controlled airspace classes A, B, C, D, and E.

Air traffic controllers ('controllers') are responsible for the separation and efficient movement of aircraft in controlled airspace. In the U.S. the operating requirements and services provided under IFR or VFR are defined under controlled airspace classes A, B, C, D, and E.

Tower controllers (aerodrome controllers) manage traffic on and near the airport: ground controllers are responsible for the movement on on taxiways of aircraft and other vehicles , and local controllers ('tower') are responsible for movement on runways, takeoffs and landings, and aircraft in flight near the airport, roughly 5 to 10 nautical miles (9 to 19 kilometres; 6 to 12 miles), depending on the airport procedures. Area controllers, based at area control centers, oversee aircraft principally during the en-route phase of flight at higher altitudes, but there are also distinct terminal controllers during climb or descent, common in the class B and class C regions around major U.S. airports.

Controllers must apply rules and procedures precisely and effectively while also making flexible adjustments in response to changing circumstances, often under time pressure. One study comparing stress in controller staff with the general population found markedly higher stress levels for controllers, a difference the study attributed, at least in part, to the characteristics of the work.

== Radar coverage ==
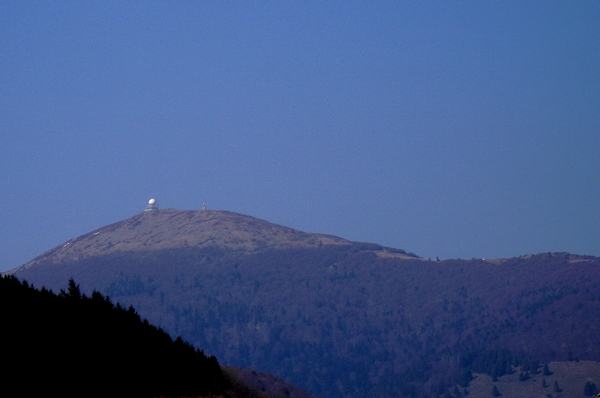
Unmanned en-route radar on a remote mountain

The position of aircraft is mainly determined by the following types of radars:

- En-route radar with a coverage up to 240 NM (460 km)
- Airport surveillance radar, with a coverage up to of 52 NM (96 km) of the airport below an elevation of 25,000 feet
- Surface movement radar with a coverage of the airport surface, within 2 NM (3.7 km)
- Secondary surveillance radar with a coverage within line-of-sight range

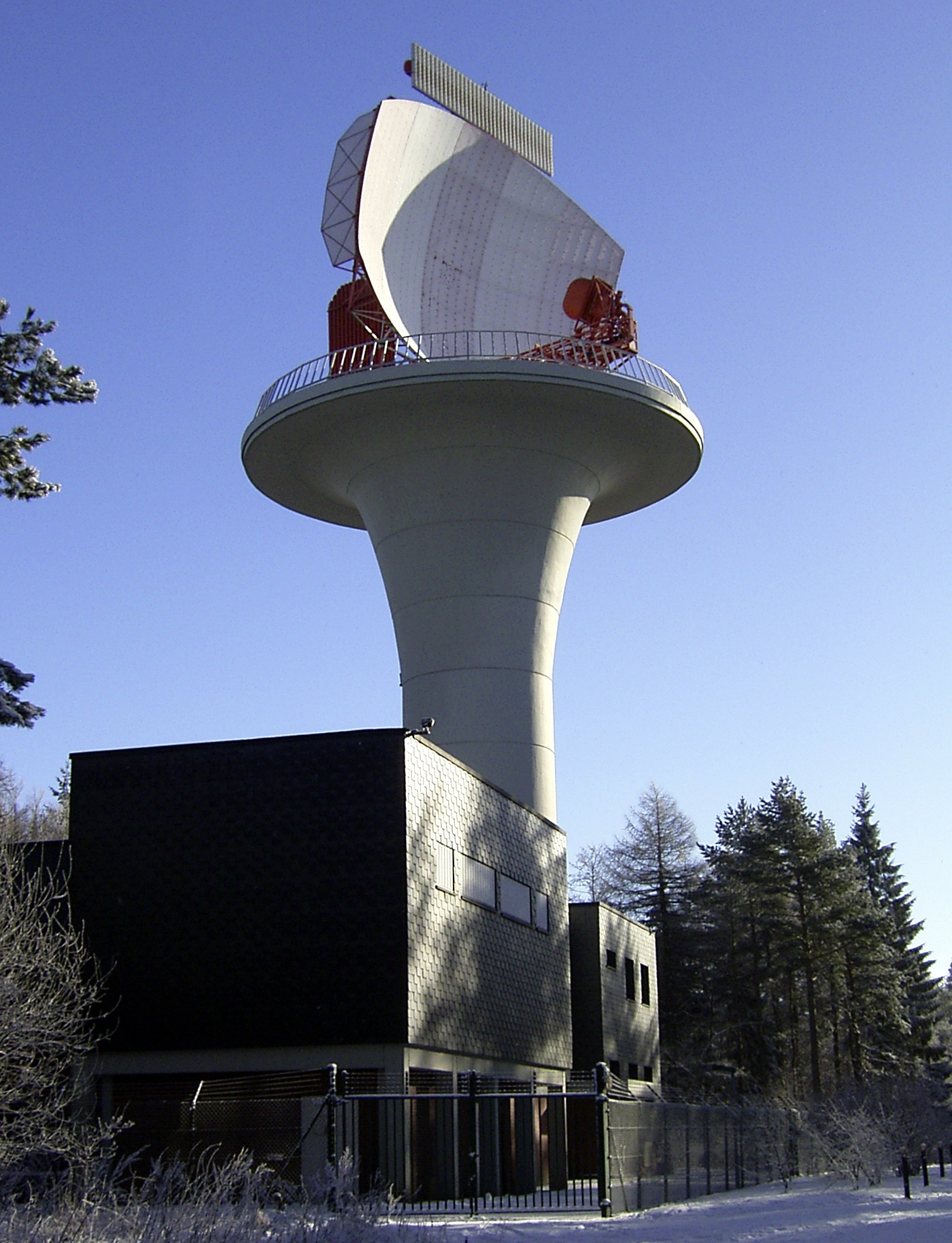
En-route radar with primary and secondary radar antennas

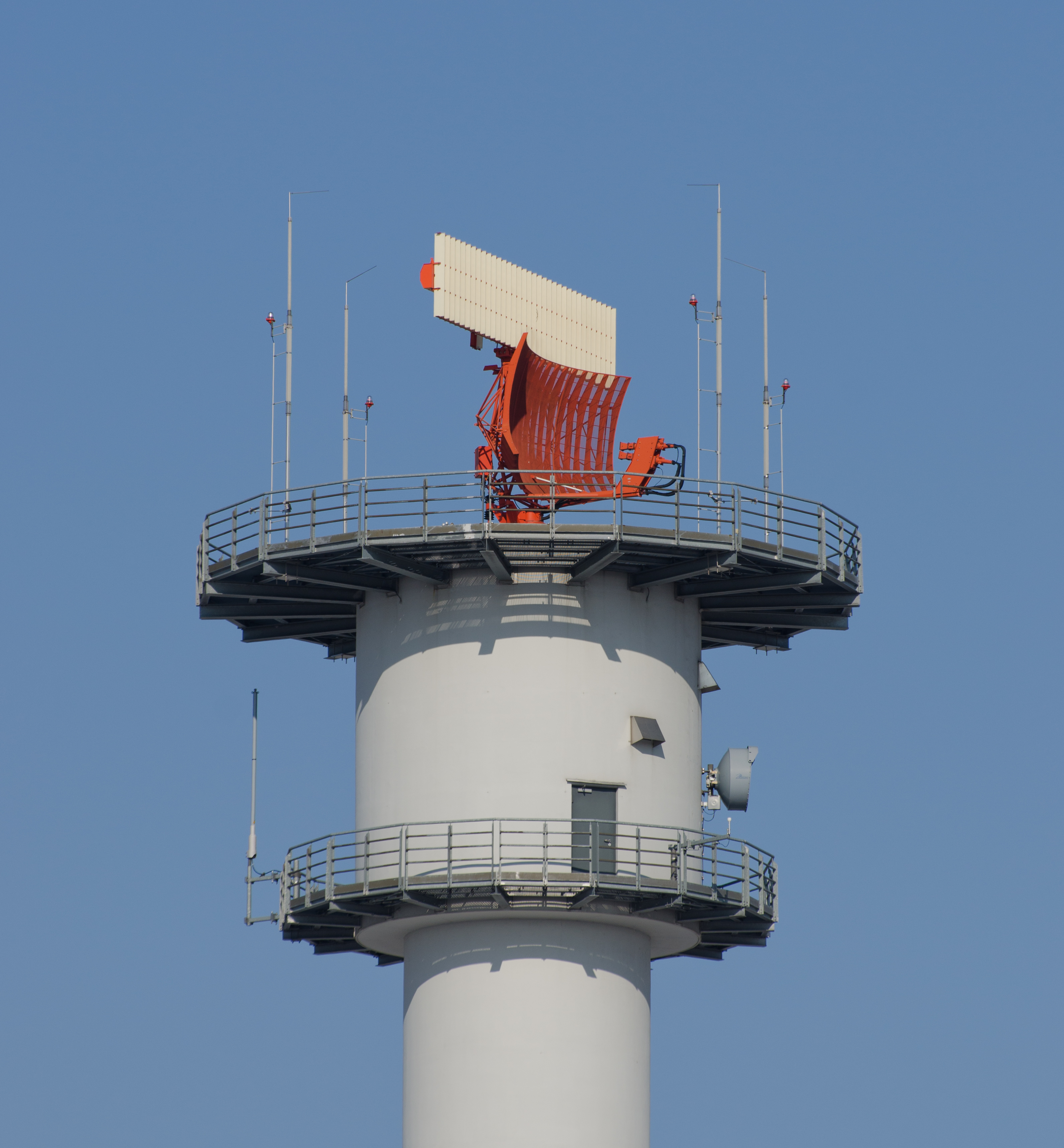
Airport surveillance radar with primary and secondary radar antennas

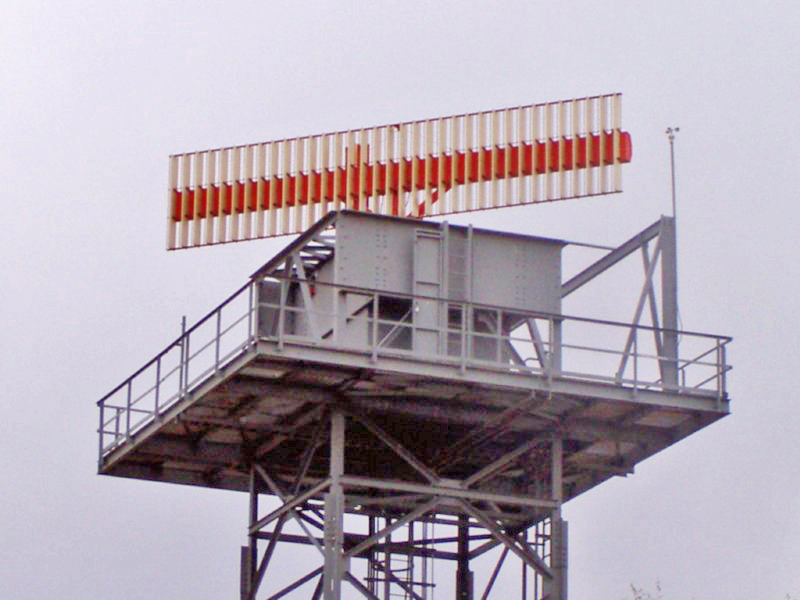
Stand-alone secondary surveillance radar

In order to extend their surveillance capabilities, some air navigation service providers (e.g., Airservices Australia, the U.S. Federal Aviation Administration, Nav Canada, etc.) have implemented automatic dependent surveillance – broadcast (ADS-B). This newer technology reverses the radar concept. Instead of radar 'finding' a target by interrogating the transponder, the ADS-B equipped aircraft 'broadcasts' a position report as determined by the navigation equipment on board the aircraft. ADS-C is another mode of automatic dependent surveillance, however ADS-C operates in the 'contract' mode, where the aircraft reports a position, automatically or initiated by the pilot, based on a predetermined time interval. It is also possible for controllers to request more frequent reports to more quickly establish aircraft position for specific reasons. However, since the cost for each report is charged by the ADS service providers to the company operating the aircraft, more frequent reports are not commonly requested, except in emergency situations. ADS-C is significant, because it can be used where it is not possible to locate the infrastructure for a radar system (e.g., over water). Operational display systems are now deployed and accept ADS-C inputs as part of their display.

A radar archive system (RAS) keeps an electronic record of all radar information, preserving it for a few weeks. This information can be useful for search and rescue. When an aircraft has 'disappeared' from radar screens, a controller can review the last radar returns from the aircraft to determine its likely position. For an example, see the crash report in the following citation.

== Problems ==
=== Traffic ===
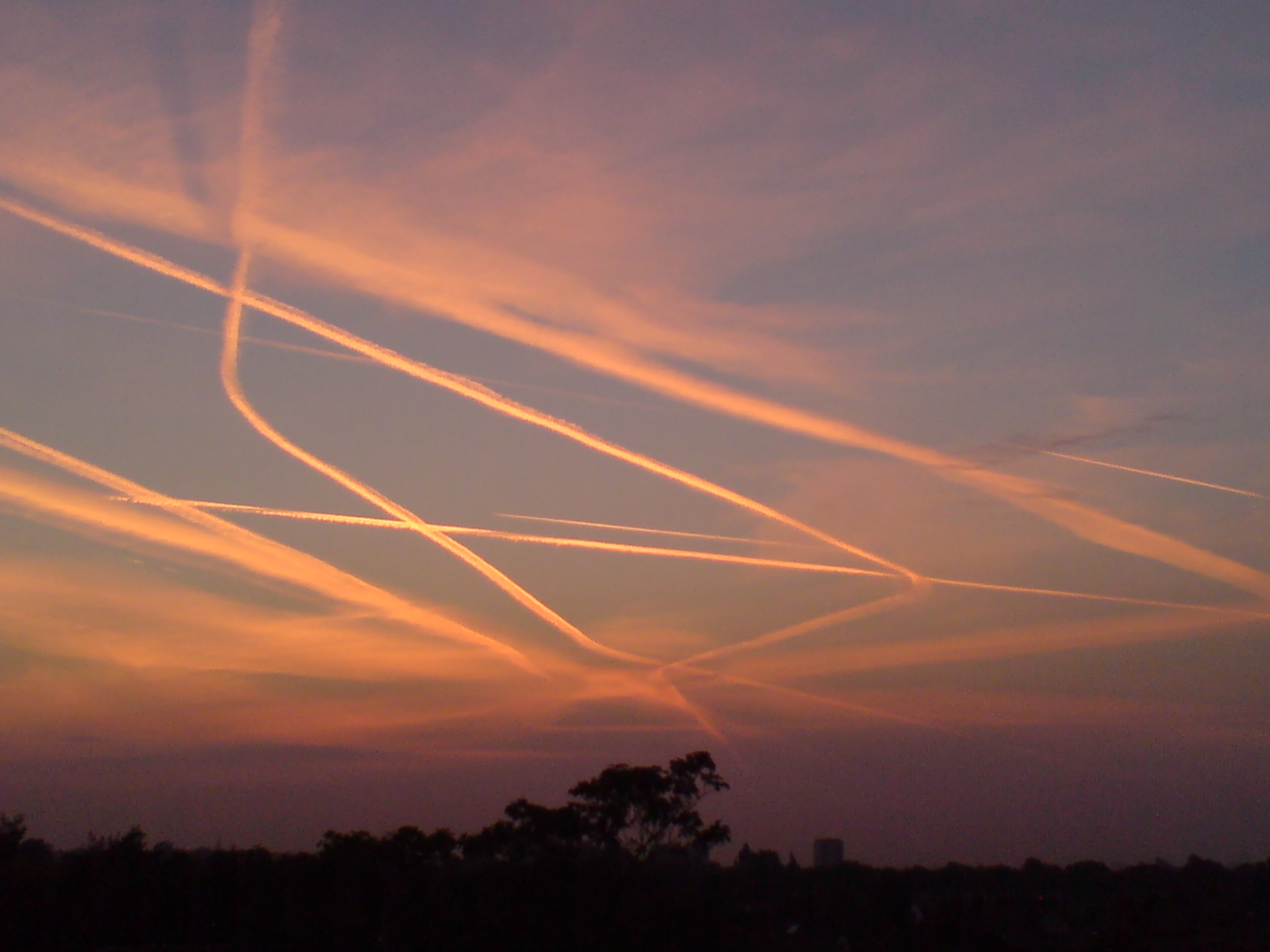
Intersecting contrails of aircraft over London, an area of high air traffic

Air traffic control errors occur when the separation (either vertical or horizontal) between airborne aircraft falls below the minimum prescribed separation set (for the domestic United States) by the U.S. Federal Aviation Administration. Separation minimums for terminal control areas (TCAs) around airports are lower than en-route standards. Errors generally occur during periods following times of intense activity, when controllers tend to relax and overlook the presence of traffic and conditions that lead to loss of minimum separation.

=== Weather ===
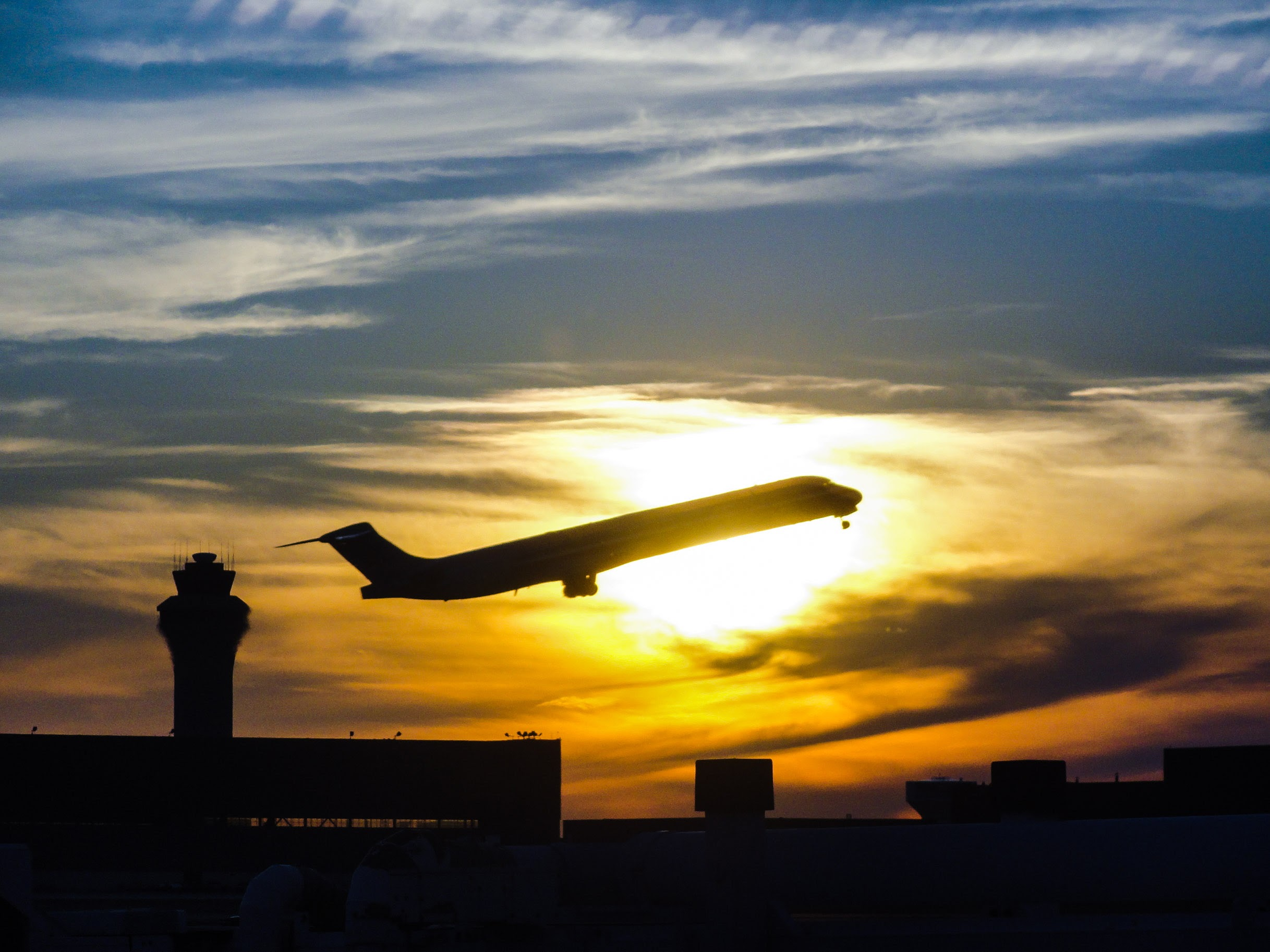
Aircraft taking off from Dallas/Fort Worth International Airport with the ATC tower in the background

=== Congestion ===
Constrained control capacity and growing traffic lead to flight cancellation and delays. In America, delays caused by ATC grew by 69% between 2012 and 2017. ATC staffing issues were a major factor in congestion.Estimates suggest that more efficient ATC could save 5-10% of aviation fuel by avoiding holding patterns and indirect airways.

Accordingly, the explanation of delays as resulting from ATC restrictions has become a common justification used by airlines to deny compensation claims. However, several European courts have determined that this rationale is sometimes applied incorrectly, with airlines attributing delays to ATC although all measures haven't been taken by the air carrier concerned to avoid the delays or cancellations.

== Call signs ==
A prerequisite to safe air traffic separation is the assignment and use of distinctive call signs. These are permanently allocated by ICAO on request, usually to scheduled flights, and some air forces and other military services for military flights. There are written call signs with a two or three letter combination followed by the flight number such as AAL872 or VLG1011. As such, they appear on flight plans and ATC radar labels. There are also the audio or radio-telephony call signs used on the radio contact between pilots and air traffic control. These are not always identical to their written counterparts. An example of an audio call sign would be 'Speedbird 832', instead of the written 'BAW832'. This is used to reduce the chance of confusion between ATC and the aircraft. By default, the call sign for any other flight is the registration number (or tail number in U.S. parlance) of the aircraft, such as 'N12345', 'C-GABC', or 'EC-IZD'. The short radio-telephony call signs for these tail numbers is the last three letters using the NATO phonetic alphabet (e.g. ABC, spoken alpha-bravo-charlie for C-GABC), or the last three numbers (e.g. three-four-five for N12345). In the United States, the prefix may be an aircraft type, model, or manufacturer in place of the first registration character, for example, 'N11842' could become 'Cessna 842'.

== Technology ==
The Federal Aviation Administration (FAA) has spent over U.S. $3 billion on software, but a fully automated system is still yet to be achieved. In 2002, the United Kingdom commissioned a new area control center into service at the London Area Control Centre (LACC) at Swanwick in Hampshire, relieving a busy suburban centre at West Drayton in Middlesex, north of London Heathrow Airport. Software from Lockheed-Martin predominates at the London Area Control Centre. However, the centre was initially troubled by software and communications problems causing delays and occasional shutdowns.

Some tools are available in different domains to help the controller further:

- Flight data processing systems: this is the system (usually one per centre) that processes all the information related to the flight (the flight plan), typically in the time horizon from gate to gate (airport departure / arrival gates). It uses such processed information to invoke other flight plan related tools (such as e.g. Medium Term Conflict Detection (MTCD)).
- Short-term conflict alert (STCA) that checks possible conflicting trajectories in a time horizon of about two or three minutes (or even less in approach context; 35 seconds in the French Roissy & Orly approach centres).
- Center TRACON automation system (CTAS): a suite of human centred decision support tools developed by NASA Ames Research Center. Several of the CTAS tools have been field tested and transitioned to the FAA for operational evaluation and use. Some of the CTAS tools are: traffic management advisor (TMA), passive final approach spacing tool (pFAST), collaborative arrival planning (CAP), direct-to (D2), en route descent advisor (EDA), and multi-center TMA. The software is running on Linux.
- MTCD and URET:
  - In Europe, several MTCD tools are available: iFACTS (National Air Traffic Services), VAFORIT (Deutsche Flugsicherung), new FDPS (Maastricht Upper Area Control). The Single European Sky ATM Research (SESAR).

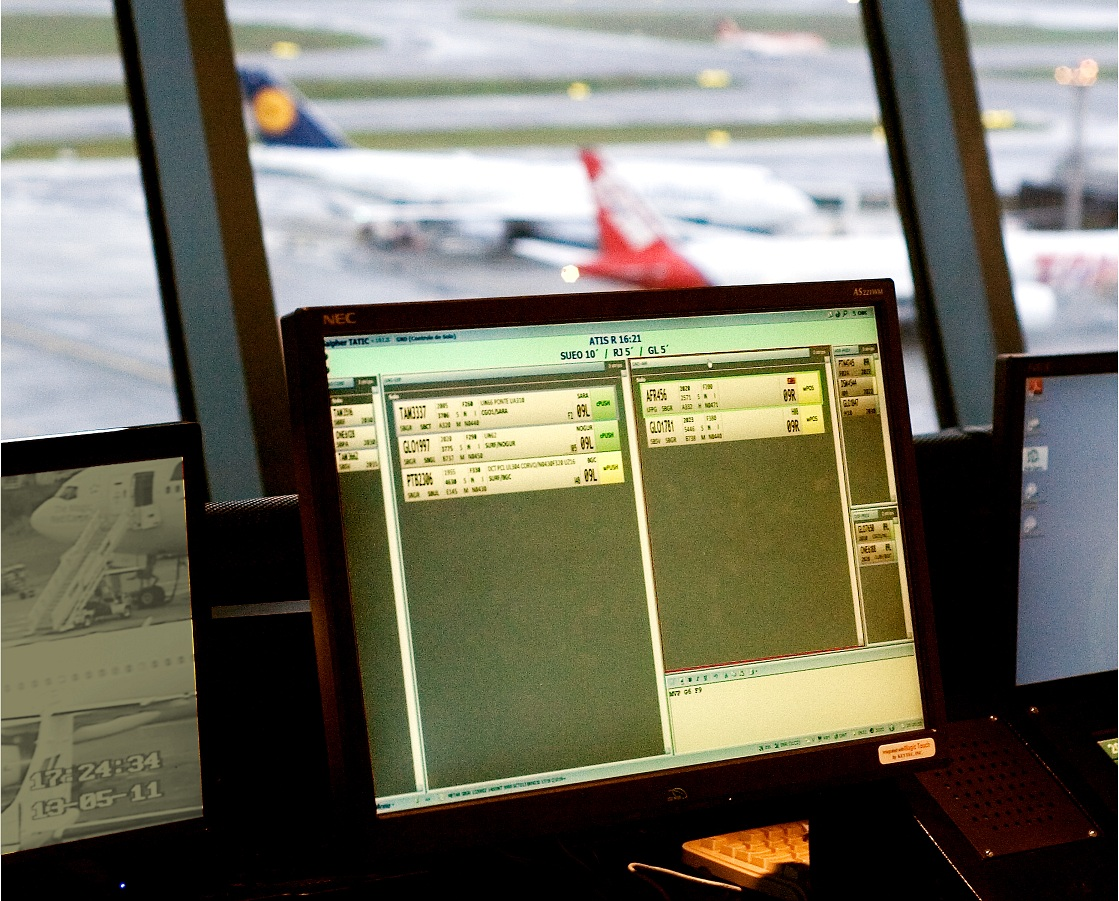
Electronic flight progress strip system at São Paulo Intl. control tower – ground control

- The Nav Canada system known as EXCDS.
- Screen content recording: hardware or software based recording function which is part of most modern automation system, and that captures the screen content shown to the ATCO. Such recordings are used for a later replay together with audio recording for investigations and post event analysis.
- Communication navigation surveillance / air traffic management (CNS / ATM) systems are communications, navigation, and surveillance systems, employing digital technologies, including satellite systems, together with various levels of automation, applied in support of a seamless global air traffic management system.

== Air navigation service providers (ANSPs) and air traffic service providers (ATSPs) ==
- Albania – Agjencia Nacionale e Trafikut Ajror
- Angola - Empresa Nacional de Navegação Aérea (ENNA)
- Armenia – Armenian Air Traffic Services (ARMATS)
- Australia – Airservices Australia (state agency) and Royal Australian Air Force.
- Austria – Austro Control
- Belgium – Skeyes (Successor of Belgocontrol)
- Brazil – Departamento de Controle de Tráfego Aéreo (military) and ANAC – Agência Nacional de Aviação Civil
- Bulgaria – Air Traffic Services Authority
- Canada – NAV CANADA
- Central America – Corporación Centroamericana de Servicios de Navegación Aerea
- Columbia – Aeronáutica Civil Colombiana
- Costa Rica – Dirección General de Aviacion Civil
- Croatia – Hrvatska kontrola zračne plovidbe (Croatia Control Ltd.)
- Cuba – IACC (Instituto de Aeronáutica Civil de Cuba)
- Czech Republic – Řízení letového provozu ČR
- Denmark – Naviair
- Dominican Republck – DGAC (Dirección General de Aeronáutica Civil)
- Estonia – Lennuliiklusteeninduse
- European Union – Eurocontrol – (European Organisation for the Safety of Air Navigation)
- Finland – Fintraffic Lennonvarmistus Oy
- France – Direction des Services de la Navigation Aérienne (DSNA), part of Direction générale de l’aviation civile: (state-owned)
- Georgia – SAKAERONAVIGATSIA, Ltd. (Georgian Air Navigation)
- Germany – DFS Deutsche Flugsicherung GmbH (state-owned); DFS Aviation Services GmbH (DAS – affiliate of DFS); Rhein-Neckar Flugplatz GmbH (Mannheim Airport); AustroControl (at some regional airports)
- Greece – Hellenic Civil Aviation Authority (HCAA)
- Guatemala – DGAC (Dirección General de Aeronáutica Civil)
- Hong Kong – CAD (state-owned)
- Hungary – HungaroControl Magyar Légiforgalmi Szolgálat Zrt. (HungaroControl Hungarian Air Navigation Services Pte. Ltd. Co.)
- India – Airports Authority of India (AAI) (department of ministry of civil aviation)
- Indonesia – Angkasa Pura II
- Ireland – AirNav Ireland
- Island – ISAVIA
- Italia – ENAV (state-owned)
- Jamaica – JCAA (Jamaica Civil Aviation Authority)
- Kenia - Kenya Civil Aviation Authority (KCAA)
- Latvia – (Latvian ATC)
- Lithuania – ANS (Lithuanian ATC)
- Luxembourg – Administration de la navigation aérienne (state-owned)
- Macedonia – DGCA (Macedonian ATC)
- Malaysia – DCA-Department of Civil Aviation
- Malta – Malta Air Traffic Services Ltd
- Mexico – Servicios a la Navegación en el Espacio Aéreo Mexicano
- Nepal – Civil Aviation Authority of Nepal
- Netherlands – Luchtverkeersleiding Nederland (LVNL)
- New Zealand – Airways New Zealand (state-owned)
- Norway – Avinor (Privatunternehmen im Staatsbesitz)
- Pakistan – Civil Aviation Authority of Pakistan (state-owned)
- Peru – Centro de Instrucción de Aviación Civil CIAC, Civil Aviation Training Center
- Philippines – Civil Aviation Authority of the Philippines (CAAP) (state-owned)
- Poland – PANSA – Polish Air Navigation Services Agency
- Portugal – NAV – (Portuguese ATC)
- Qatar - Qatar Civil Aviation Authority (QCAA)
- Romania – Romanian Air Traffic Services Administration – (ROMATSA)
- Russia – Federal State Unitary Enterprise – (State ATM Corporation)
- Saudi-Arabia – General Authority of Civil Aviation (GACA)
- Serbia – Serbia and Montenegro Air Traffic Services Agency Ltd. (SMATSA)
- Somaliland -Somaliland Civil Aviation and Airports Authority
- Somalia- Somali Civil Airports Authority
- Singapore – CAAS (Civil Aviation Authority of Singapore)
- Slovakia – Letové prevádzkové služby Slovenskej republiky
- Slovenia – Slovenia Control
- South Africa – Air Traffic and Navigation Services
- Spain – ENAIRE
- Sweden – The LFV Group (Swedish ATC)
- Switzerland – Skyguide
- Taiwan – ANWS Civil Aeronautical Administration
- Tanzania - Tanzania Civil Aviation Authority (TCAA)
- Thailand – AEROTHAI (Aeronautical Radio of Thailand)
- Trinidad and Tobago – TTCAA (Trinidad and Tobago Civil Aviation Authority)
- Turkey – DGCA (Turkish Directorate General of Civil Aviation)
- Ukraine – Ukrainian State Air Traffic Service Enterprise (UkSATSE)
- United Arab Emirates – General Civil Aviation Authority (GCAA)
- United Kingdom – National Air Traffic Services (Public Private Partnership)
- United States – Federal Aviation Administration (state-owned)
- Venezuela – INAC (Instituto Nacional de Aviación Civil)
- Vietnam – Vietnam Air Traffic Management Corporation (VATM)
- Zambia – Zambia Civil Aviation Authority (ZCAA)
- Zimbabwe – Zimbabwe Civil Aviation Authority

== Proposed changes ==
In the United States, free flight is a developing air traffic control method that uses no centralised control (e.g. air traffic controllers). Instead, parts of airspace are reserved dynamically and automatically in a distributed way using computer communication to ensure the required separation between aircraft.

In Europe, the Single European Sky ATM Research (SESAR) programme plans to develop new methods, technologies, procedures, and systems to accommodate future (2020 and beyond) air traffic needs. In October 2018, European controller unions dismissed setting targets to improve ATC as "a waste of time and effort", as new technology could cut costs for users but threaten their jobs. In April 2019, the EU called for a 'Digital European Sky', focusing on cutting costs by including a common digitisation standard, and allowing controllers to move to where they are needed instead of merging national ATCs, as it would not solve all problems. Single air-traffic control services in continent-sized America and China does not alleviate congestion. Eurocontrol tries to reduce delays by diverting flights to less busy routes: flight paths across Europe were redesigned to accommodate the new airport in Istanbul, which opened in April, but the extra capacity will be absorbed by rising demand for air travel.

Well-paid jobs in western Europe could move east with cheaper labour. The average Spanish controller earn over €200,000 a year, over seven times the country average salary, more than pilots, and at least ten controllers were paid over €810,000 ($1.1m) a year in 2010. French controllers spent a cumulative nine months on strike between 2004 and 2016.

=== Privatisation ===
Many countries have also privatised or corporatised their air navigation service providers. There are several models that can be used for ATC service providers. The first is to have the ATC services be part of a government agency as is currently the case in the United States. The problem with this model is that funding can be inconsistent, and can disrupt the development and operation of services. Sometimes funding can disappear when lawmakers cannot approve budgets in time. Both proponents and opponents of privatisation recognise that stable funding is one of the major factors for successful upgrades of ATC infrastructure. Some of the funding issues include sequestration and politicisation of projects. Proponents argue that moving ATC services to a private corporation could stabilise funding over the long term which will result in more predictable planning and rollout of new technology as well as training of personnel. As of November 2024, The United States had 265 contractor towers that are staffed by private companies but administered by FAA through its FAA Contract Tower Program, which was established in 1982. These contract control towers cover 51% of all the Federal air traffic control towers in the U.S.

Another model is to have ATC services provided by a government corporation. This model is used in Germany, where funding is obtained through user fees. Yet another model is to have a for-profit corporation operate ATC services. This is the model used in the United Kingdom, but there have been several issues with the system there, including a large-scale failure in December 2014 which caused delays and cancellations and has been attributed to cost-cutting measures put in place by this corporation. In fact, earlier that year, the corporation owned by the German government won the bid to provide ATC services for Gatwick Airport in the United Kingdom. The last model, which is often the suggested model for the United States to transition to is to have a non-profit organisation that would handle ATC services as is used in Canada.

The Canadian system is the one most often used as a model by proponents of privatisation. Air traffic control privatisation has been successful in Canada with the creation of Nav Canada, a private non-profit organisation which has reduced costs, and has allowed new technologies to be deployed faster due to the elimination of much of the bureaucratic red tape. This has resulted in shorter flights and less fuel usage. It has also resulted in flights being safer due to new technology. Nav Canada is funded from fees that are collected from the airlines based on the weight of the aircraft and the distance flown.

Air traffic control is operated by national governments with few exceptions: in the European Union, only Italy has private shareholders. Privatisation does not guarantee lower prices: the profit margin of MUAC was 70% in 2017, as there is no competition, but governments could offer fixed terms concessions.

== ATC regulations in the United States ==
The United States airspace is divided into 21 zones (centres), and each zone is divided into sectors. Also within each zone are portions of airspace, about 50 miles (80 kilometres) in diameter, called TRACON (Terminal Radar Approach Control) airspaces. Within each TRACON airspace are a number of airports, each of which has its own airspace with a 5 miles (8.0 kilometres) radius. FAA control tower operators (CTO) / air traffic controllers use FAA Order 7110.65 as the authority for all procedures regarding air traffic.

== See also ==
- Air traffic service – Service regulating aircraft
- Flight information service officer
- Flight planning – Process of producing a flight plan
- ICAO recommendations on use of the International System of Units
- Forward air control – Direction of close air support
- Global air-traffic management
- List of tallest air traffic control towers in the United States
- Non-towered airport – Airport without an air traffic control tower
- Remote and virtual tower
- RMCDE – SuRveillance Message Conversion and Distribution Equipment for Air Traffic Control
- Tower en route control (TEC)
- Mobile Air Traffic Control Tower
