= Provincetown Municipal Airport =

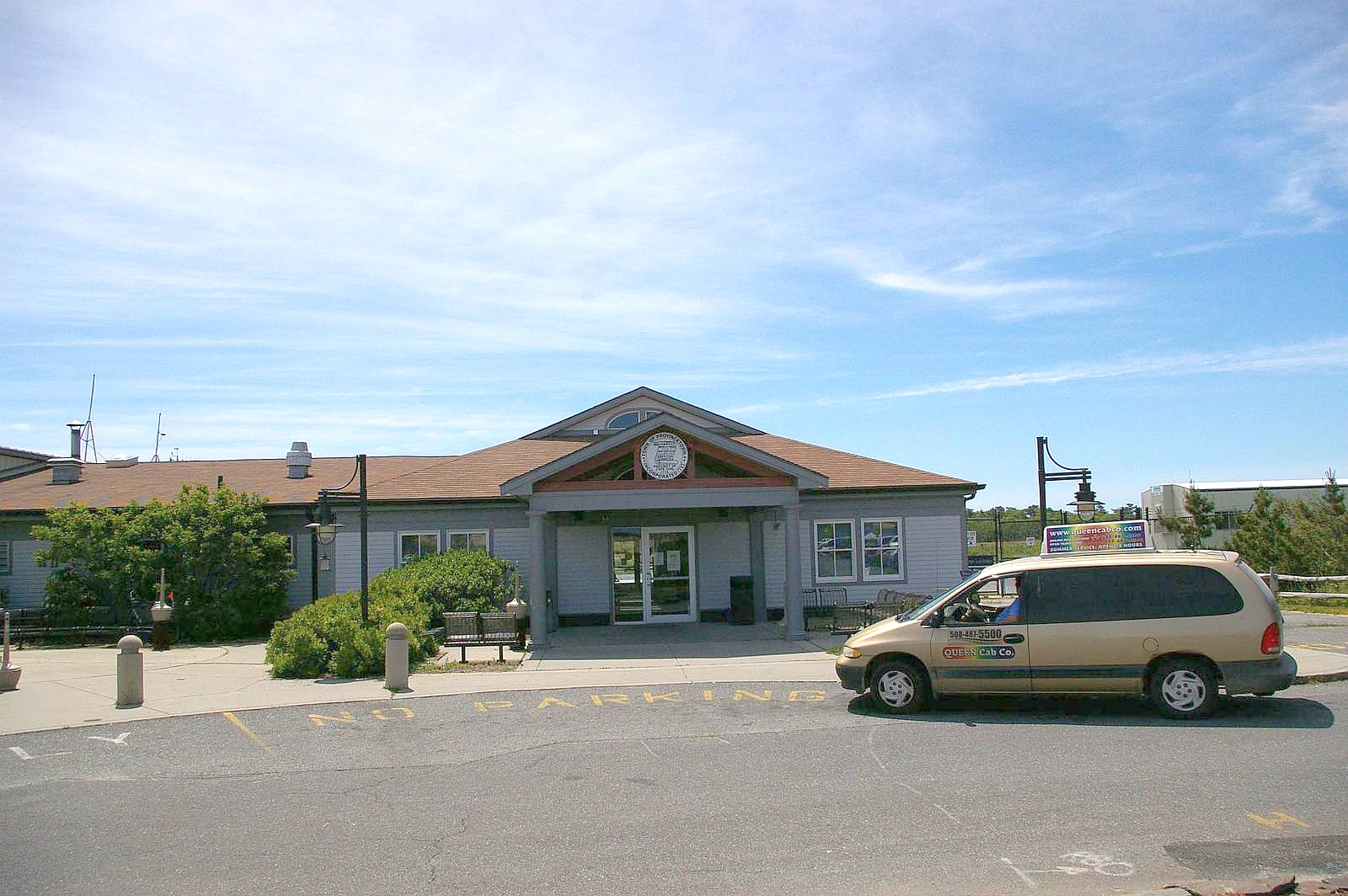
- IATA: PVC; ICAO: KPVC; FAA LID: PVC

Summary
- Airport type: Public
- Owner: National Park Service
- Operator: Town of Provincetown
- Serves: Provincetown, Massachusetts
- Elevation AMSL: 9 ft (2.7 m)
- Coordinates: 42°04′19″N 070°13′17″W
- Website: PVC website

Map
- Interactive map of Provincetown Municipal Airport

Runways
Direction	Length		Surface
Direction	ft	m	Surface
07/25	3,502	1,067	Asphalt

Provincetown Municipal Airport (IATA: PVC, ICAO: KPVC, FAA LID: PVC) is a public airport located at the end of Cape Cod, two miles (3 km) northwest of the central business district of Provincetown, in Barnstable County, Massachusetts, United States. This airport is operated by the Town of Provincetown on land leased from the United States National Park Service.

The airport is used for general aviation and by one commercial airline, Cape Air, which seasonally operates non-stop flights of 25 minutes duration to Boston's Logan International Airport. On summer weekends, flights are scheduled approximately every 45 minutes in both directions.

== History ==
The airport was constructed in the 1940s and the runway was first paved in 1948. The original transitions to the taxiways were curved, or jug-handle-shaped to support tail-draggers like the DC-3 that operated at the airport in the 1940s and 1950s.

In 1949, Provincetown-Boston Airlines started scheduled air service between Provincetown and Boston using Cessna Bobcats. Through a series of mergers, PBA was eventually acquired by People Express and which later merged with Continental Airlines and in 1988, Continental cancelled the Provincetown - Boston route. Cape Air began operations that same year and continues to serve Provincetown today.

The present terminal building is a single-story wooden structure and was constructed in 1998. The terminal provides Cape Air check-in and a waiting area, TSA screening areas, and a conference room.

== Facilities and aircraft ==
Provincetown Municipal Airport covers an area of 310 acres (125 ha).

Runway information
Dimensions	3502 x 100 ft. / 1067 x 30m	
Surface	Asphalt, in good condition	
Weight bearing capacity	Single wheel: 25.0	
Runway edge lights	High intensity	
	Runway 7	Runway 25
Latitude	42-04.189783N	42-04.484083N
Longitude	070-13.576812W	070-12.911400W
Elevation (MSL)	7.6 ft	7.8 ft
Traffic pattern	Left	Right
Runway heading	075 magnetic 059 true	255 magnetic 239 true
Markings	Precision, in good condition	Precision, in good condition
Visual slope indicator	4-light PAPI on right (3.00 degrees glide path)	4-light PAPI on right (3.00 degrees glide path) VGSI and descent angle not coincident
Approach lights	MALSF: 1,400 foot medium intensity approach lighting system with sequenced flashers	None
Runway end identifier lights	Yes	Yes
Touchdown point	Yes, no lights	Yes, no lights
Instrument approach	ILS/DME, RNAV (GPS)	NDB, RNAV (GPS)
Obstructions	12 ft. brush, 800 ft. from runway, 125 ft. left of centerline	12 ft. trees, 610 ft. from runway, 125 ft. left of centerline, 34:1 slope to clear

For the 12-month period ending September 1, 2016, the airport averaged 136 operations per day: 85% transient general aviation, 8% commercial, 2% air taxi, 4% local general aviation and <1% military. There are 10 aircraft based at this airport: 8 single engine and 2 multi-engine.

The airport has complimentary high-speed internet access for all passengers and crew members utilizing the facility. A limited amount of free parking is available for vehicles used by general and commercial aviation passengers. Aircraft parking is available from Cape Air, the fixed-base operator (FBO).

== Airline and destinations ==
Airlines	Destinations
Cape Air	Seasonal: Boston

== Airport management ==
The Provincetown Airport is overseen by the Airport Commission, a five-person board appointed by the Provincetown Board of Selectmen.

== Incidents ==
On August 31, 2011, a Piper PA-28 Cherokee carrying two people, crashed shortly after take-off. The pilot, a 48-year-old man, was killed in the crash but his 47 year-old-wife, survived and was airlifted to Boston with non-life threathening injuries. Toxicological investigation pointed out that the pilot was inebriated, which was determined as the likely cause. The pilot was also not certified to fly at the time the incident took place.

On September 9, 2021, a Cessna 402 carrying 6 passengers crashed after a failed go-around attempt. There were no deaths, but all occupants were brought to the hospital severely wounded. Investigation by the NTSB concluded the cause was pilot error.

On January 7, 2026, a Cessna 172 crashed on the runway. Its pilot and sole occupant, 60-year-old Christopher Burroughs of Attleboro, lost his life in the crash

== See also ==
- List of airports in Massachusetts
