= Bielefeld airport =

German airport

Bielefeld airport Flughafen Bielefeld
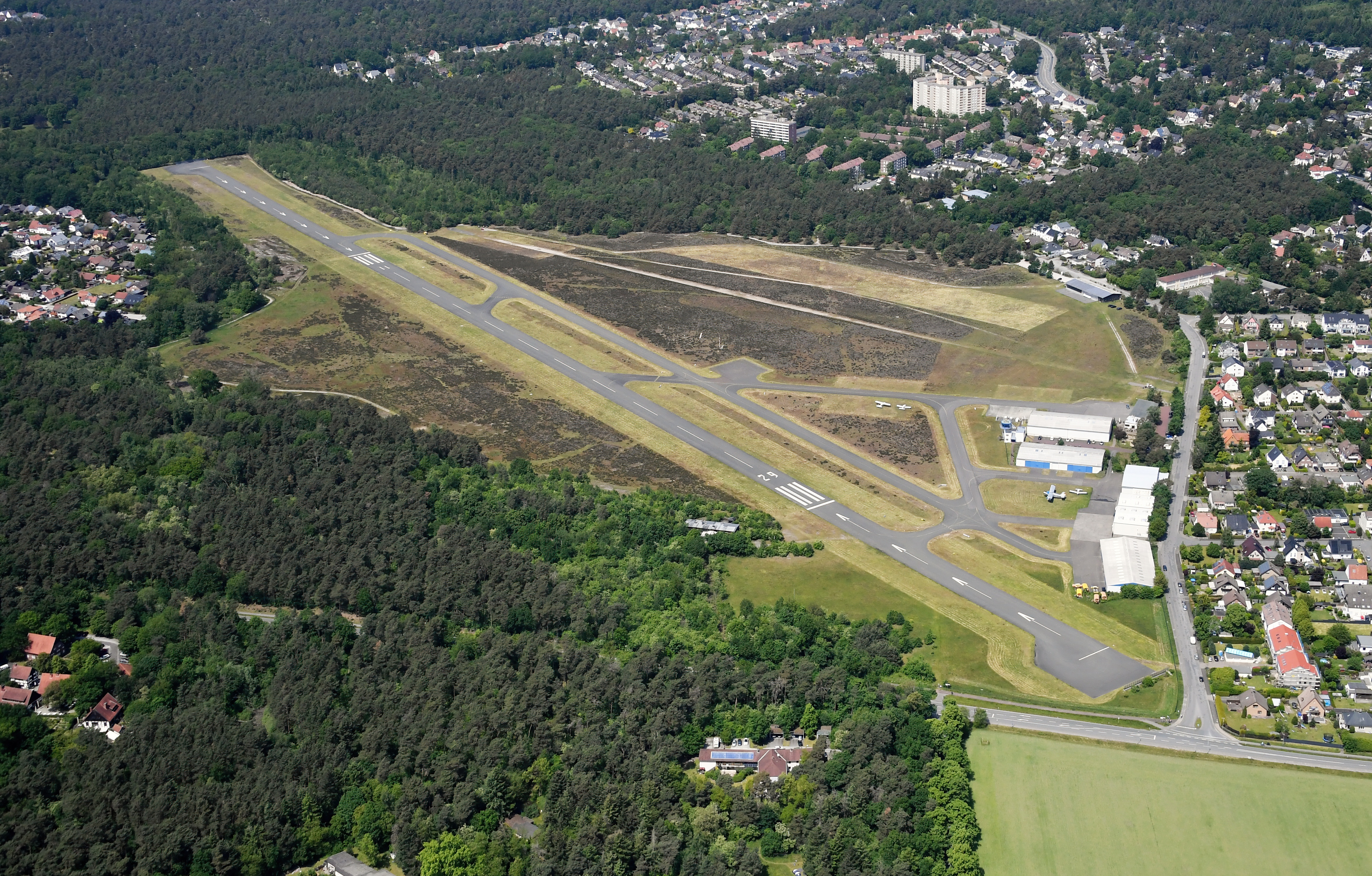
- An aerial shot of the airport area
- IATA: BFE; ICAO: EDLI

Summary
- Operator: Flughafen Bielefeld GmbH
- Location: Bielefeld
- Opened: 1930
- Built: 31 August 1930
- Elevation AMSL: 454 ft (138 m)
- Coordinates: 51.964833°N 8.544833°E
- Website: https://flugplatz-bielefeld.de/

Map
- Location within North Rhine-Westphalia

Runways
Direction	Length		Surface
Direction	ft	m	Surface
11/29	4,121	1,256	Asphalt
06/24 (closed)	3,313	1,010	Grass

Bielefeld Airport (Sometimes referred to as Windelsbleiche Airfield, IATA-Code: BFE, ICAO-Code EDLI) is the local airfield of the city of Bielefeld. The airport is located roughly 7 Kilometers south of the city center in the district of Senne and being maintained by the Flughafen Bielefeld GmbH.

The shareholders include the City of Bielefeld, the IHK Ostwestfalen and 13 other businesses from the region. The airport has a paved and lighted runway and is mainly being used by the local businesses, private entities and the local air sports clubs.

== History and current state of the airport ==
After the end of World War 1, aviation started to become very popular. The first landings of flying machines in Bielefeld took place on the racecourse in Bielefeld-Quelle. As the idea of an airfield met with great interest, the landing of the "Graf Zeppelin," one of the largest airships of its time, was negotiated to take place in Bielefeld. For this event, a proper airfield was needed. Therefore, the search for an area began. Originally the airport should have been constructed in Bielefeld-Heepen but in the end they decided to construct the airport in Windelsbleiche which back then was not a part of the city of Bielefeld. The reason for this was the better connection to the railroad. Also, unlike in Heepen, there was no need to erect 100 ticket booths for the airship landing.

The construction of the airfield was finished on August 31, 1930, and about 100,000 people came to the airship landing event. The revenue from the 62,000 tickets sold was going to be used to expand the airfield over the next few years.

From 1932 on, the German Lufthansa used the airport as an axillary airfield for their night route from Berlin over Hanover and Cologne to London. For this purpose, lights were installed and trees cut down to make it easier to land. Meteorological equipment was also installed.

The German dictator Adolf Hitler was not satisfied with the airfield after he landed there on July 9, 1933. Therefore, many improvements were made to it. These improvements mostly consisted of clearing the approach path of trees. In the same year an aircraft hangar was built and in the following year the construction of a pilot dormitory and a new hangar started. They also build a filling station for the airplanes. The construction of the pilots' dormitory was finished in 1936 and a flight school started its service in 1937. During the second world war, the students of this school were taught to fly military aircraft. The Luftwaffe did not launch any attacks from Bielefeld.

The airfield was handed over to the British army in 1945 after the end of the war. The British army did not use the airfield a lot as the neighboring airport in Gütersloh was a lot larger already and had, unlike the one in Bielefeld, a paved runway.

During the occupation, German citizens were banned from flying. When Germany regained air sovereignty in May 1955 as a result of the Paris Treaties (abolition of the occupation status of the Federal Republic of Germany), the airport and the confiscated hangars were released. Immediately after the release, a construction ban was imposed with building restrictions for the airfield. The airport was now managed by the newly founded Flughafen Bielefeld GmbH and initially received a license valid until the end of 1961. The local residents around the airport were unsatisfied with the noise of the airplanes and went as far as wanting a closure of the airport. Therefore, the state government stated that they wanted to move the airport to a different location. During the 1950s and 60s a lot of restrictions were put on the airport to reduce the aircraft noise. Back then the airport used to have a second runway with the initials 06/24. When using this runway, the airplanes flew over the nearly located Buschkamp-school. To reduce flights over the school, the runway 11/29 was made more attractive by cutting down more trees to improve the approach path.

In January 1963 the city council of Bielefeld wanted to build a new airport north of Bielefeld-Jöllenbeck in Nagelsholz. Due to many protests by local farmers and residents, the project failed.

During the 1970s the runway 11/29 was paved and new restrictions were put on the air traffic. In 1976 as many as 30.000 aircraft movements took place in Bielefeld.

The state of the airport had become worse until the year 1998. A renovation was needed. A new tower and some hangars were constructed and in 2005 the extension of the runway 11/29 began. For this extension, about three hectares of forest was cut down and partially replaced. Local residents were concerned about the increasing noise of larger airplanes being able to land at the airport. The traffic institute of Münster saw the renovation as a necessary step to keep the airport. All constructions were finished in 2006.

=== Facilities and operations ===
Bielefeld airport features a runway approximately 1,300 meters long. The runway has an approach aid and lighting. Flights are only possible using visual flight rules. The runway is capable of serving small business jets. Aviation fuel is available airports filling station.

The airport is primarily used by local companies, private individuals and aviation clubs. It is officially classified as a public airfield (Verkehrslandeplatz) and is open for public air traffic, but does not support scheduled commercial flights. Commercial passengers from the region usually rely on airports such as Paderborn-Lippstadt.
