= Land and hold short operations =

Air traffic control procedure

Boston Logan International Airport has 4 LAHSO points depicted on its airport diagram.

Land and Hold Short Operations (LAHSO, pronounced "La-So") is an air traffic control procedure for aircraft landing and holding short of an intersecting runway or point on a runway, to balance airport capacity and system efficiency with safety.

Its use is voluntary: if a pilot denies LAHSO clearance the Air Traffic Controller must revector the aircraft to ensure adequate separation from other aircraft landing or departing an intersecting runway or crossing down field. Due to the inherent risk of simultaneous runway operations, a heightened level of situational awareness is necessary, and student pilots or pilots not familiar with LAHSO should not participate in the program.

Although used in the US, many countries do not permit LAHSO clearances, and some airlines' operating procedures do not allow their acceptance in countries that do permit them.

LAHSO was previously called SOIR (Simultaneous Operations on Intersecting Runways), and incorporates and expands all SOIR definitions.

== Types ==
There are three main types, to land and hold on the runway:

- Intersecting Runway: before the intersection with another runway that will have another aircraft taking off or landing.
- Intersecting Taxiway: before the intersection with a taxiway that will have other aircraft taxiing for takeoff or parking.
- Point on Runway: before a designated point. This is the newest type, used when safety precautions are needed due to hazards concerning other runways or taxiways, or hazards for a landing plane on its runway (ice, for instance).

== Requirements ==
Non-air carrier aircraft: ceiling 1,000 feet and visibility 3 statute miles.
Air carrier aircraft: ceiling 1,500 feet and visibility 5 statute miles, unless the landing runway is equipped with precision approach path indicator (PAPI) or visual approach slope indicator (VASI), in which case 1,000 feet ceiling and 3 statute miles visibility must be applicable. For configurations requiring a RLP (rejected landing procedure), the ceiling and visibility may differ.

Student pilots shall not receive a LAHSO from ATC.

== See also ==
- Federal Aviation Administration -- LAHSO, 2000 August 14
- FAA LAHSO guide, reference to Aeronautical Information Manual (AIM) 4-3-11: Pilot Responsibilities When Conducting LAHSO
- Aircraft Owners and Pilots Association (AOPA) -- Pilot Responsibilities When Conducting LAHSO, Retrieved 2021
