= KPVC =

KPVC may refer to:

- Provincetown Municipal Airport (ICAO code KPVC)
- KPVC-LP, a low-power radio station (92.1 FM) licensed to serve Dallas, Texas, United States
