= Visual approach slope indicator =

Runway light set

The visual approach slope indicator (VASI) is a system of lights on the side of an airport runway threshold that provides visual descent guidance information during final approach. These lights may be visible from up to 8 kilometres (5.0 mi) during the day and up to 32 kilometres (20 mi) or more at night.

== Standard VASI ==
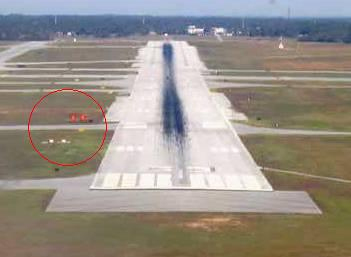
Standard visual approach slope indicator (circled in red)

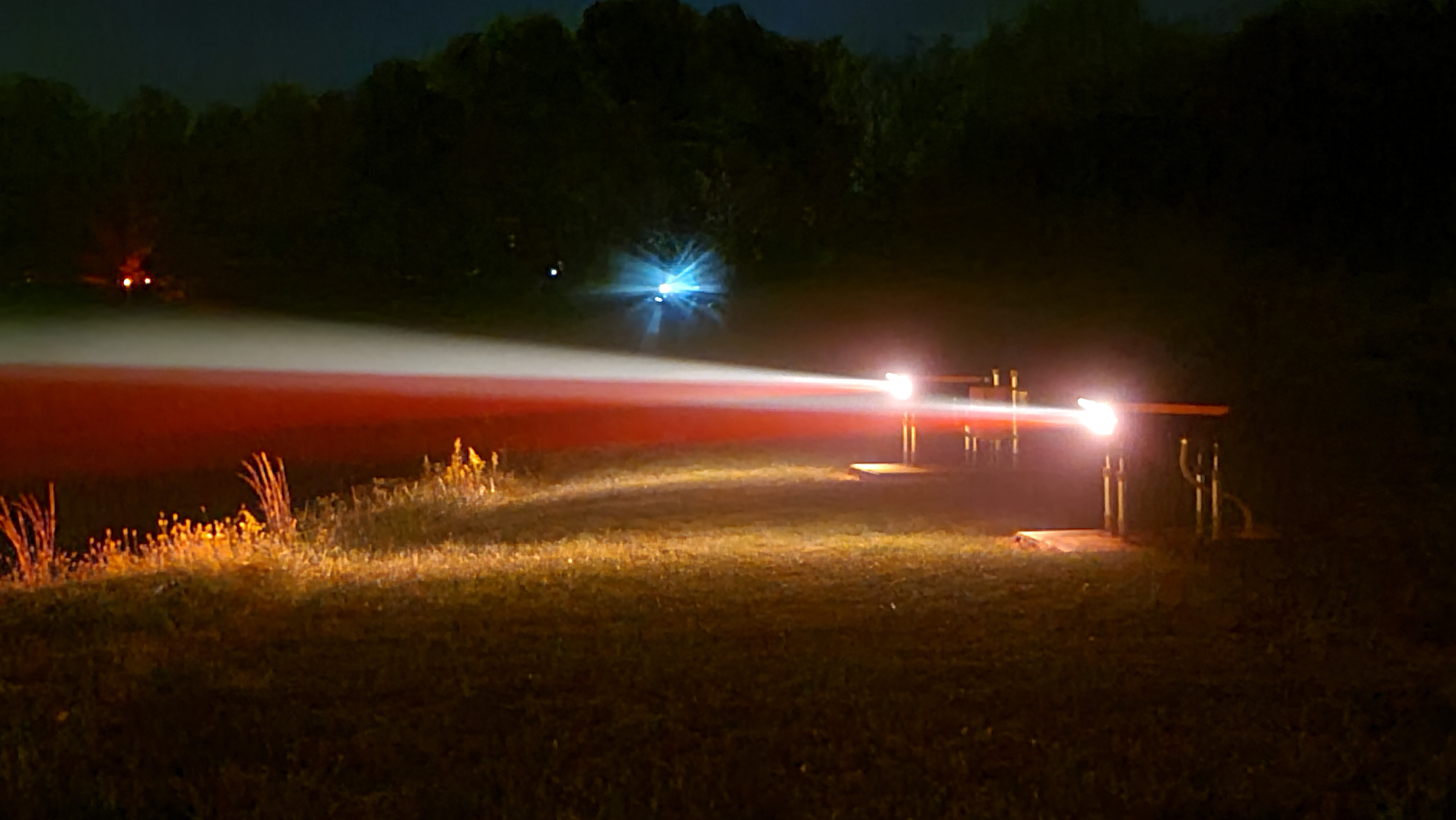
Working VASI

Comparison of PAPI, VASI, and OLS meatball and datum lights (not to scale)

Basic visual approach slope indicators consist of one set of lights set up 7 metres (23 ft) from the start of the runway. Each light is designed so that it appears as either white or red, depending on the angle at which it is viewed. When the pilot is approaching the lights at the proper angle, meaning the pilot is on the glide slope, the first set of lights appears white and the second set appears red. When both sets appear white, the aircraft is too high, and when both appear red it is too low. This used to be the most common type of visual approach slope indicator system; however, it is being phased out and replaced by precision approach path indicators (PAPIs), which are closer together and therefore more efficient to sight and maintain.

A mnemonic to remember the colors and their meaning is:

White over White, you're high as a kite / you'll fly all night / check your height / you're out of sight / too much height.
Red over White, you're alright / height's alright.
Red over Red, you're dead / pilot's dead.

(White over Red is not possible.)

Simple VASIs are obsolete, having been deleted from ICAO Annex 14 in 1995, however T-VASIS and AT-VASIS are still specified. T-VASIS is defined as twenty light units symmetrically disposed about the runway centre line in the form of two wing bars of four light units each, with bisecting longitudinal lines of six lights". AT-VASIS is an abbreviated form of T-VASIS, defined as "ten light units arranged on one side of the runway in the form of a single wing bar of four light units with a bisecting longitudinal line of six lights."

== Tri-color VASI ==
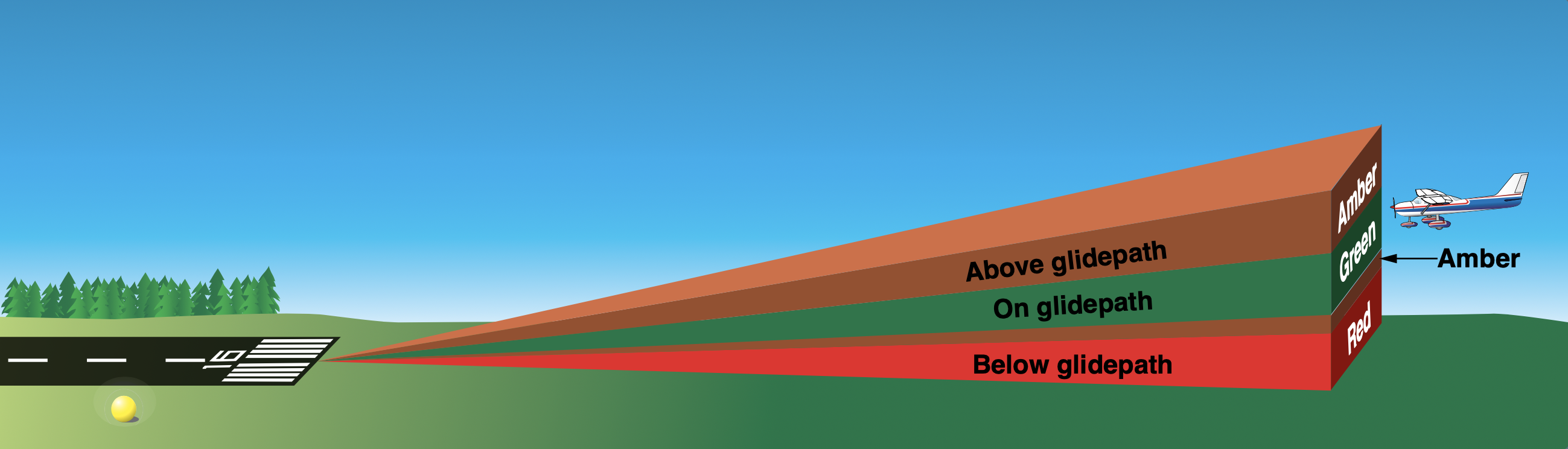
Tri-color VASI

A tri-color system consists of a single-light unit projecting a three-color visual approach path. Below the glide path is indicated by red, on the glide path is indicated by green, and above the glide path is indicated by amber. When descending below the glide path, there is a small area of dark amber. Pilots should not mistake this area for an “above the glide path” indication.

== Pulsating VASI ==
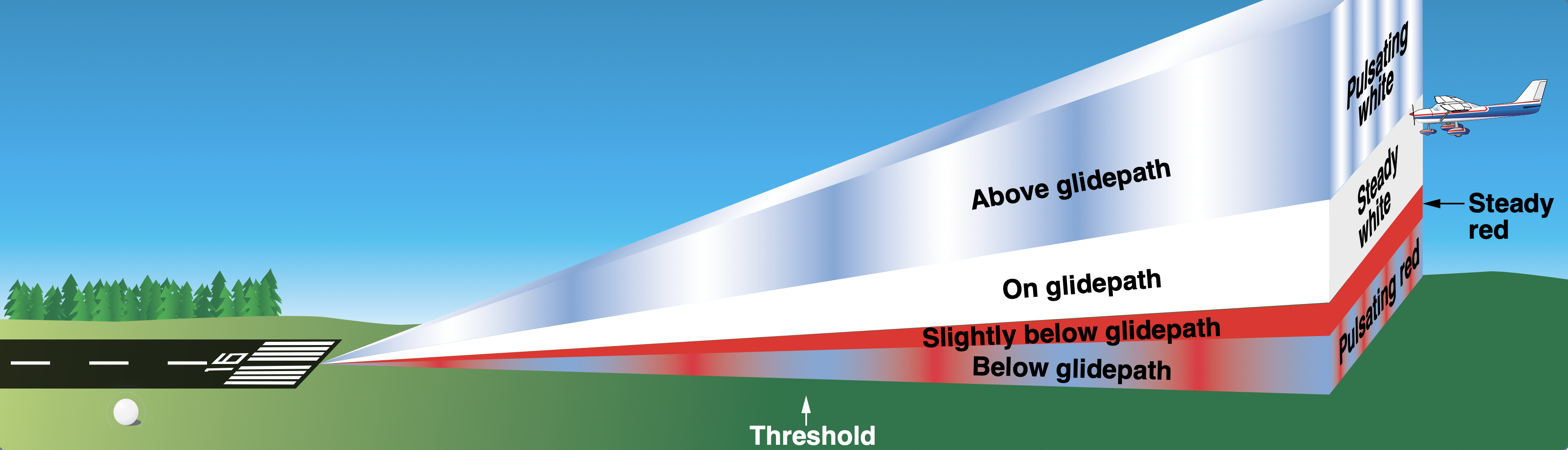
Pulsating VASI

The pulsating visual approach slope indicator (PVASI) is a system similar in purpose to a VASI, but only consists of one piece of equipment. It indicates the pilot's height on approach with a mix of red and white, steady and pulsating light. Pulsating white light indicates that the aircraft is too high, whereas steady white indicates being on the glide path. Steady red light is meant to show a position only slightly below glide path, with pulsating red light being indicative of a position well below glide path. This type of system is less prevalent than other visual glide slope indicators like regular VASIs or PAPIs: as of May 2022 there were only 84 PVASIs installed at 51 airports and heliports in the United States and its territories according to Federal Aviation Administration data, compared to 6730 PAPIs and 623 VASIs.

== Dual VASI ==
Some airports serving long-bodied aircraft have three-bar VASIs that provide two visual glide paths to the same runway. The first glide path encountered is the same as provided by the standard VASI. The second glide path is about 25 percent higher than the first and is designed for the use of pilots of long-bodied aircraft.

== See also ==
- Index of aviation articles
- Approach lighting system (ALS)
- Leading lights
- Optical landing system (OLS)
- Precision approach path indicator (PAPI)
- Pilot controlled lighting (PCL)
- Runway edge lights (HIRL, MIRL, LIRL)
- Runway end identifier lights (REIL)
