= Precision approach path indicator =

Visual aid in aviation

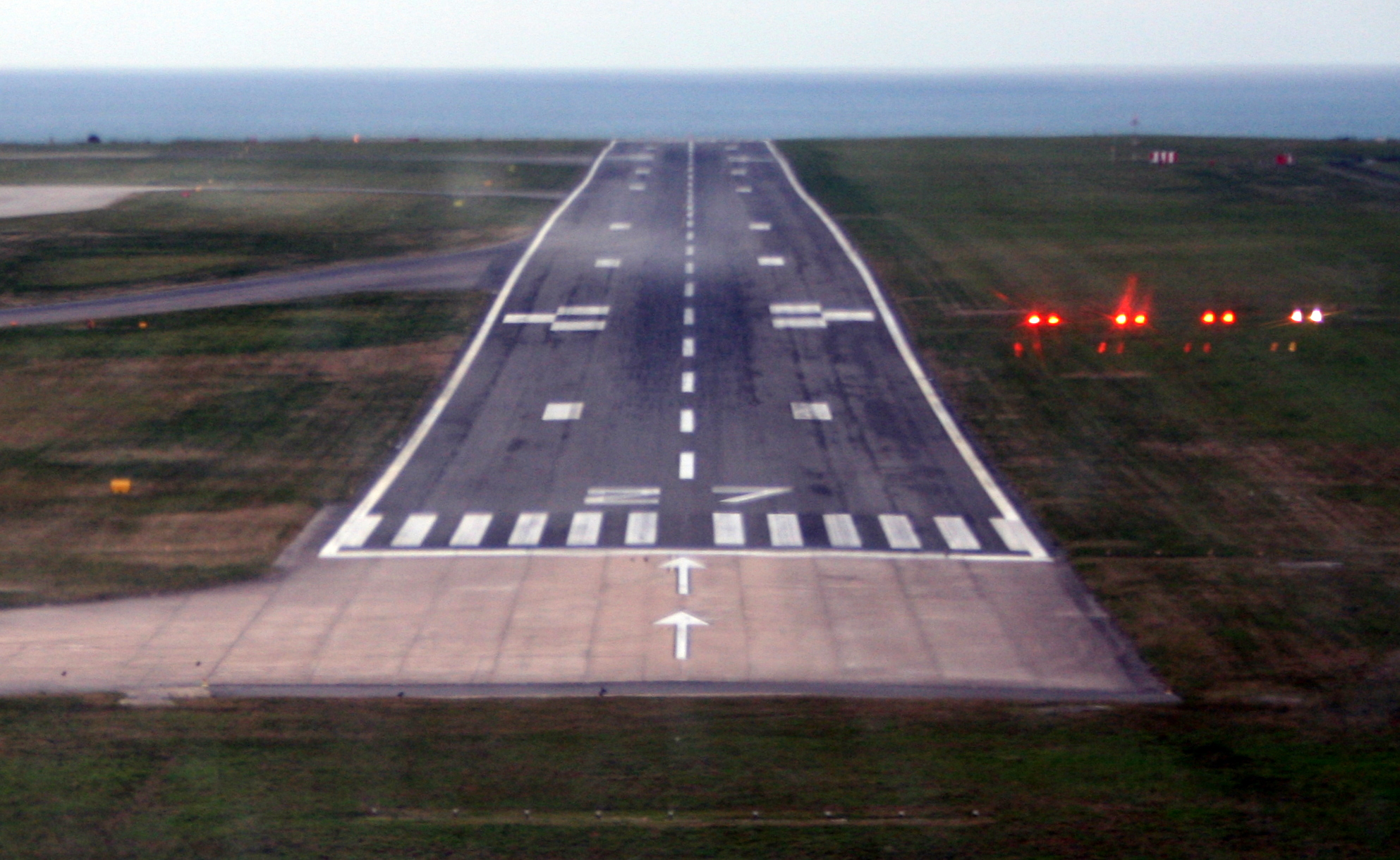
The PAPI can be seen to the right (non-standard) side of the runway. The aircraft is slightly below the glideslope.

A precision approach path indicator (PAPI) is a system of four lights on the side of an airport runway threshold that provides visual descent guidance information during final approach. It is generally located on the left side of the runway approximately 300 metres (980 ft) beyond the landing threshold of the runway.

== Design and installation ==
A typical engineering design specification for each of the four PAPI light unit is shown below:

Schematic diagram of longitudinal section 1 = Axis datum 2 = Light source 3 = Red filter 4 = Lenses 5 / 6 = Light beam- white/red

Optical construction:

- Two lamps for redundancy;
- Anodized aluminium reflectors;
- Red color filter;
- One or two lenses;
- Lamps and reflectors replaceable without recalibration.

Each light unit consists of one or more light sources, red filters and lenses. A color filter may not be necessary with colored LED lights. Each light unit emits a high-intensity beam. The lower segment of the beam is red, and the upper part is white. The transition between the two colours must take place over an angle not greater than three minutes of arc. This characteristic makes the color change very conspicuous, a key feature of the PAPI signal. To form the PAPI guidance signal, the color transition boundaries of the four units are fixed at different angles. The lowest angle is used for the unit furthest from the runway, the highest for the unit nearest to the runway. The designated glideslope is midway between the second and third light unit settings.

A PAPI installation consists of a bar of four units. Units should be frangible but not susceptible to jet blast. The inner edge of the PAPI installation should be situated 15 metres (49 ft) from the runway edge, and not closer than 14 metres (46 ft) to any runway or taxiway. The units should be spaced 9 metres (30 ft) apart. An abbreviated system, A-PAPI, can be used for some categories of aircraft operations. It consists of two units with the inner unit located 10 metres (33 ft) from the runway edge.

The PAPI should be located on the left side of the runway at right angles to the runway center line, although can be located on the right side of the runway if required. The red lights are always counted starting from the side of the PAPI array closest to the runway. If the PAPI lights are on the right side of the runway (non-standard), then the red lights will counted up starting from the left of the array. At some locations, PAPIs are installed on both sides of the runway but this level of provision is beyond the requirements of the International Civil Aviation Organization (ICAO).

The optimum distance from the runway threshold depends on the wheel clearance over the threshold of the types of aircraft expected to land on the runway; compatibility with non-visual glide paths such as instrument landing system (ILS) down to the minimum possible range and height; and any difference in elevation between the PAPI installation and the runway threshold. This optimum distance may be adjusted depending on runway length and obstacle clearance. Harmonisation between PAPIs and an ILS system must take into account the distance between eye height and ILS receiver height for various aircraft.

For a typical 3 degree approach slope, PAPI lights should be angled as follows: 3°30', 3°10', 2°50', 2°30' (3.50°, 3.17°, 2.83°, 2.50°).

== Interpretation ==
Comparison of PAPI, VASI, and OLS meatball and datum lights (not to scale)

The ratio of white to red lights seen is dependent on the angle of approach to the runway. Above the designated glide slope a pilot will see more white lights than red; below the ideal angle more red lights than white will be seen. At the optimum approach angle the ratio of white to red lights will be equal, for most aircraft.

Student pilots in initial training may use the mnemonic

- WHITE on WHITE – "Check your height" (or "You're gonna fly all night") (too high)
- RED on WHITE – "You're all right"
- RED on RED – "You're dead" (too low)

until they are used to the lights' meaning.

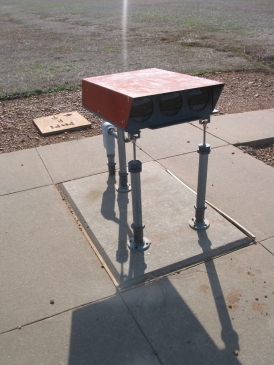
Individual precision approach path indicator

PAPIs are calibrated relative to the Minimum Eye Height over Threshold (MEHT). For certain aircraft with a low pilot eye height, the pilot will see a "slightly low" indication even though they are on the ILS glideslope. Pilot eye height is usually above the ILS receiver antenna. Concorde had a particularly high eye height because the main undercarriage was so far behind the cockpit, so the pilots needed to land with a "slightly high" indication.

The light characteristics of all light units are identical. In good visibility conditions the guidance information can be used at ranges up to 5 miles (8.0 km) by day and night. At night the light bars can be seen at ranges of at least 20 miles (32 km).

PAPI systems are readily available from airfield lighting manufacturers worldwide. PAPI is normally operated by air traffic control (ATC). If ATC services are not normally provided at an aerodrome, PAPI along with other airport lights may be activated by the pilot by keying the aircraft microphone with the aircraft's communication radio tuned to the CTAF or dedicated pilot controlled lighting (PCL) frequency.

== History ==
The precision approach path indicator system was first devised in 1974 by Tony Smith and David Johnson at the Royal Aircraft Establishment in Bedford, England. It took them a further two years to fully develop the technology. Engineering firm Research Engineers (RE) were also heavily involved in the project, having produced and supplied PAPI units for the first trials that were conducted. The same design is still in use today.

Smith and Johnson's work was honoured by a commendation from the RAE, a Fellowship from the Aeronautical Society, an award from the American Flight Safety Foundation, and a Gold Medal from the British Guild of Air Pilots.

PAPIs were used by NASA's Space Shuttle for its safe landing, for which Johnson was interviewed by UK local news media and TV.

An earlier glideslope indicator system, the visual approach slope indicator (VASI), only provided guidance down to heights of 60 metres (200 ft) whereas PAPI provides guidance down to flare initiation (typically 15 metres, or 50 ft).

2008 saw the advent of new PAPI devices manufactured using solid state LED lamps instead of incandescent lamps. The LEDs produce sufficient brightness to satisfy ICAO light intensity and beamspread standards, and average lifetime with the LED based systems is 50,000 hours or more. By using LEDs, the device's power consumption is lowered considerably. The LED systems run internally on DC voltage, so the DC voltage requirements, along with the LEDs' inherently low power consumption, now allow for solar-powered PAPIs, enabling them to function completely independently of a power grid.

The PAPI system is co-opted for use by the Final Approach Runway Occupancy Signal (FAROS) system being introduced by several major airports in the United States for the purpose of allowing pilots to resolve a runway incursion without requiring a priori notice of an occupied runway from the control tower. In FAROS, automated line-of-sight runway sensors detect if a vehicle has committed a runway incursion, and if so, will flash the PAPI lights to alert the pilot of an aircraft on final approach that the runway is currently occupied. The pilot then becomes responsible for resolving the conflict by notifying the air traffic controller and executing a go-around. Once the tower has ascertained that the runway has been cleared, the ground controller resets the PAPI so that landing operations may resume normally.

== See also ==
- Approach lighting system (ALS)
- Pilot controlled lighting (PCL)
- Visual approach slope indicator (VASI)
- Runway end identifier lights (REIL)
- Runway edge lights (HIRL, MIRL, LIRL)
- Optical landing system
- Leading lights
