= Runway edge lights =

Lighting system used to identify the perimeter of an airport runway

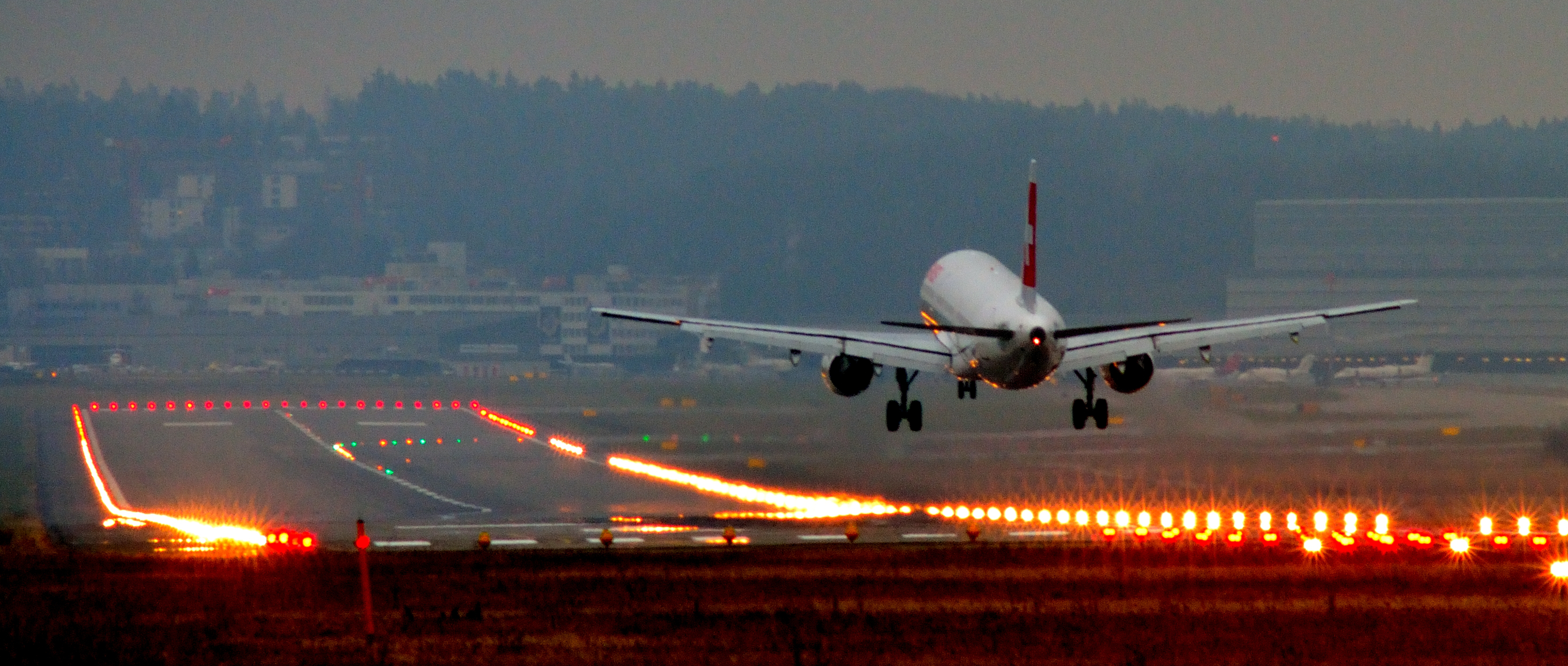
An aircraft landing at Zurich Airport, with runway edge lights visible

Runway edge lighting is used to outline the edges of runways during periods of darkness or restricted visibility conditions. These light systems are classified according to the intensity they are capable of producing:

- High intensity runway lights (HIRL)
- Medium intensity runway lights (MIRL)
- Low intensity runway lights (LIRL)

Many HIRL and MIRL systems have variable intensity controls, whereas the LIRLs normally have one intensity setting. At airports where there is a control tower, the tower will manage the lights to account for visibility and pilot preference, but some airports do not have control towers. These airports will have Pilot Controlled Lighting, or PCL, where pilots can adjust the lighting themselves by keying a microphone button a certain number of times.

The majority of runway edge lights are clear or white, but there are some exceptions to provide additional information to pilots in certain circumstances.

When an instrument runway lighting is designed, the last 600 metres (2,000 ft), or one-half of the runway length available (whichever is less), are bi-directional. They look white to the pilot approaching from the short end of the runway, but to a pilot approaching from the other end, who would be landing or taking off in that direction, they are yellow to indicate that the runway is nearing the end.

== See also ==
- Approach lighting system
- Pilot-controlled lighting
- Precision approach path indicator
- Runway end identifier lights
- Visual approach slope indicator
