= Approach lighting system =

Runway lighting installed on the approach end which extends beyond the runway

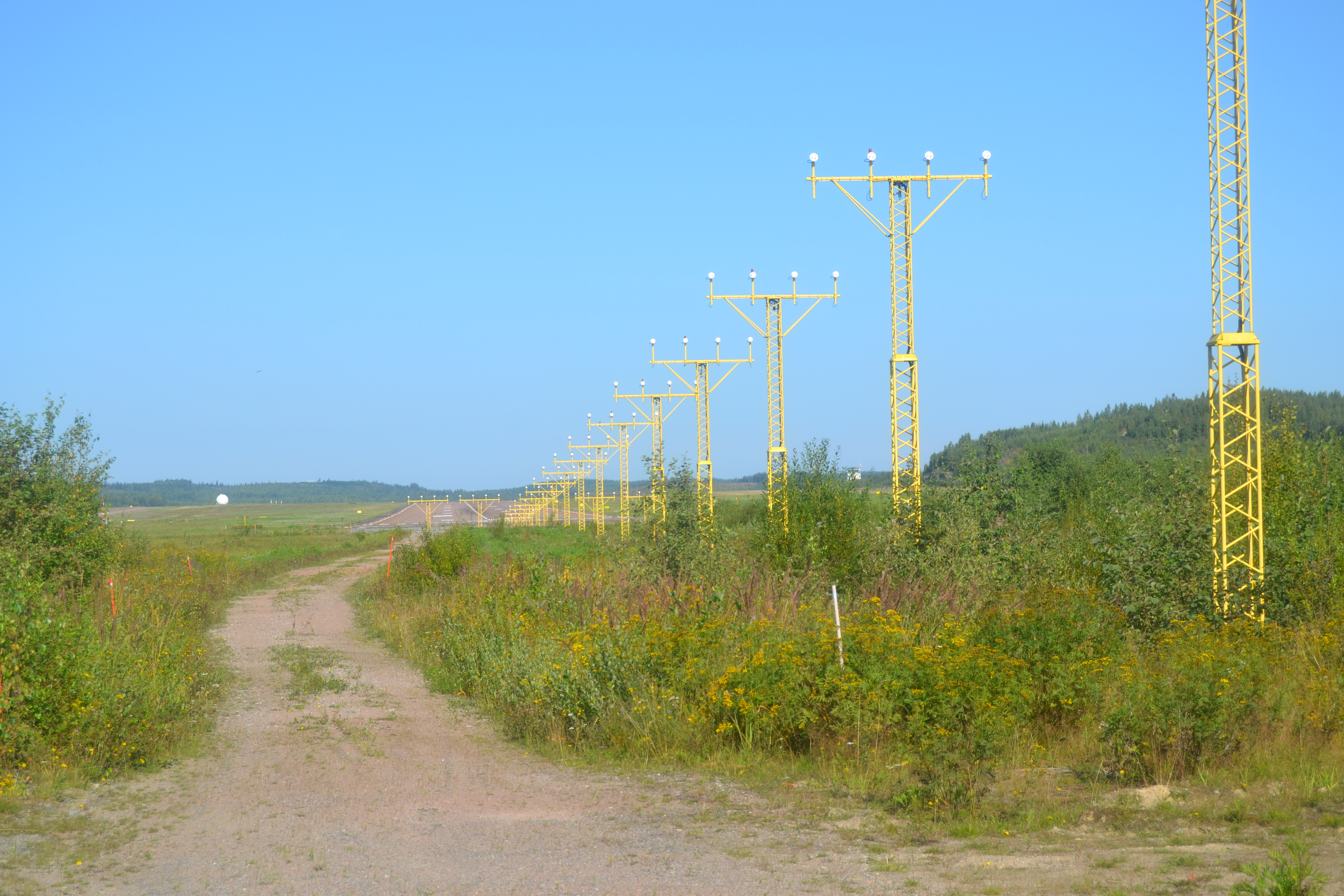
Approach lights at Jyväskylä Airport, Finland

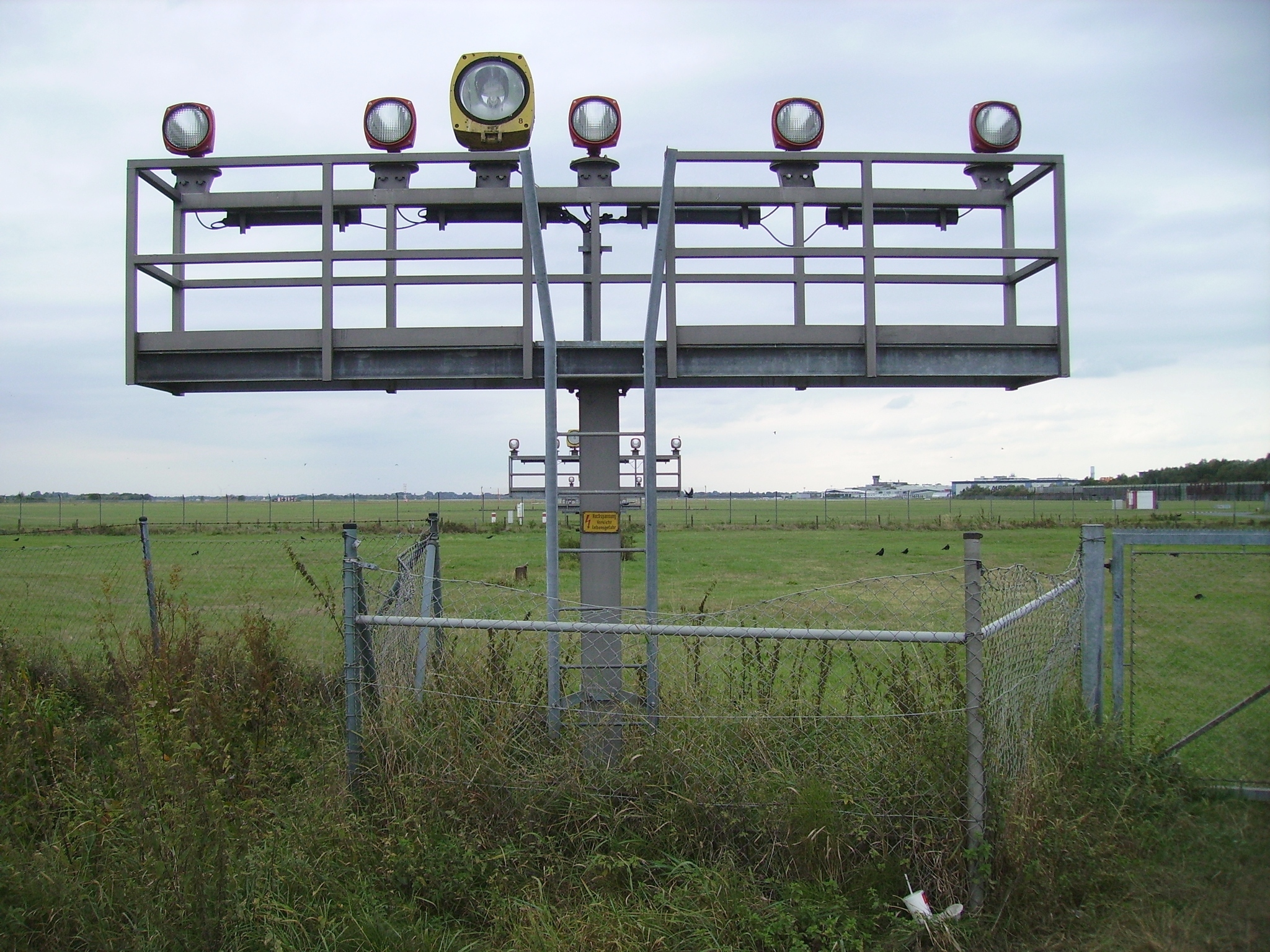
The approach lighting system of Bremen Airport

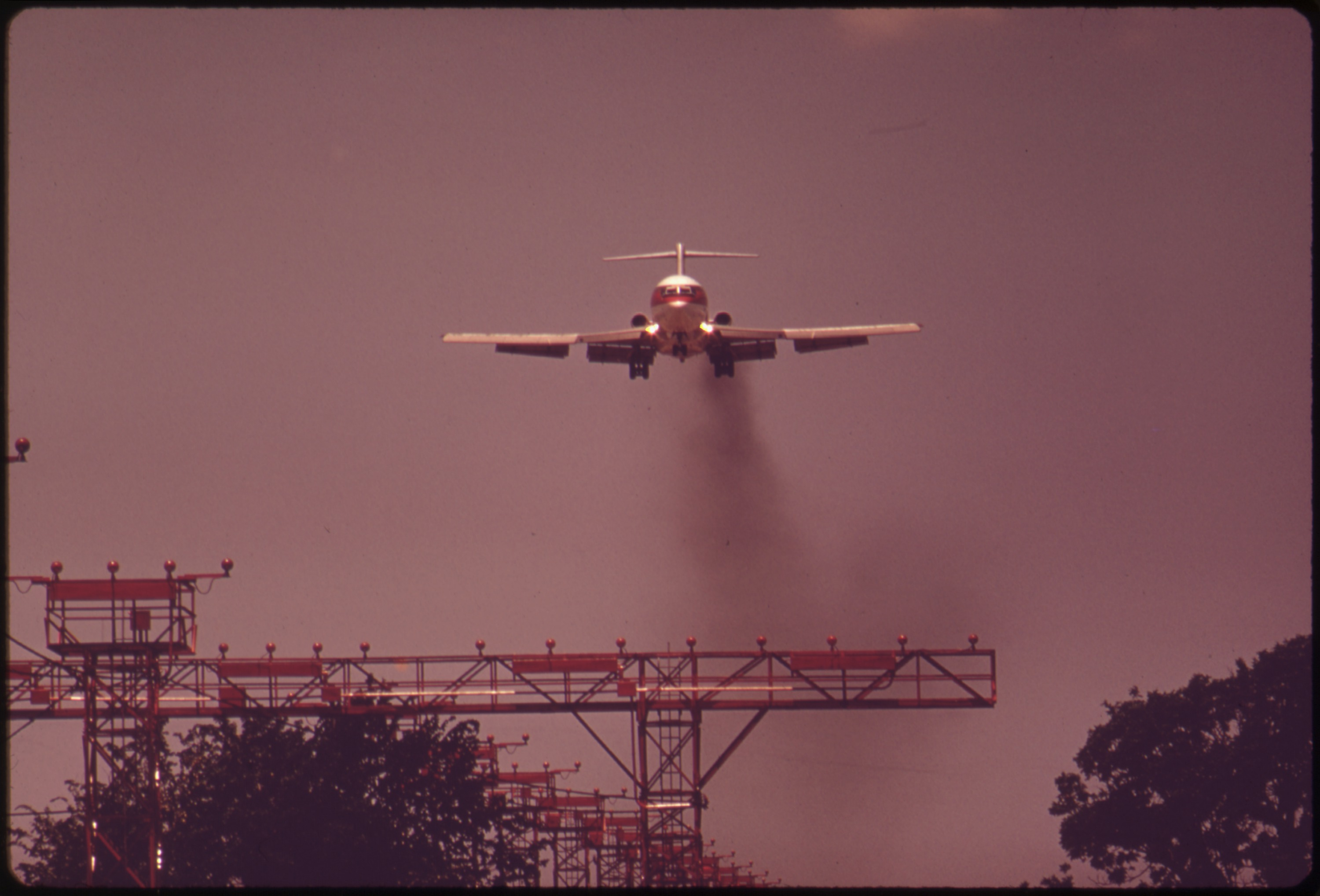
Approach lighting at Love Field, Dallas

An approach lighting system (ALS) is a lighting system installed on the approach end of an airport runway and consisting of a series of lightbars, strobe lights, or a combination of the two that extends outward from the runway end. ALS usually serves a runway that has an instrument approach procedure (IAP) associated with it and allows the pilot to visually identify the runway environment and align the aircraft with the runway upon arriving at a prescribed point on an approach.

Modern approach lighting systems are highly complex in their design and significantly enhance the safety of aircraft operations, particularly in conditions of reduced visibility.

== Operation ==
The required minimum visibilities for instrument approaches is influenced by the presence and type of approach lighting system. In the U.S., a CAT I ILS approach without approach lights will have a minimum required visibility of 3/4 mile, or 4000 foot runway visual range. With a 1400-foot or longer approach light system, the minimum potential visibility might be reduced to 1/2 mile (2400 runway visual range), and the presence of touchdown zone and centerline lights with a suitable approach light system might further reduce the visibility to 3/8 mile (1800 feet runway visual range).

The runway lighting is controlled by the air traffic control tower. At non-towered airports, pilot-controlled lighting may be installed that can be switched on by the pilot via radio. In both cases, the brightness of the lights can be adjusted for day and night operations.

Depth perception is inoperative at the distances usually involved in flying aircraft, and so the position and distance of a runway with respect to an aircraft must be judged by a pilot using only two-dimensional cues such as perspective, as well as angular size and movement within the visual field. Approach lighting systems provide additional cues that bear a known relationship to the runway itself and help pilots to judge distance and alignment for landing.

== History ==
After World War II, the U.S. Navy and United Airlines worked together on various methods at the U.S. Navy's Landing Aids Experimental Station located at the Arcata–Eureka Airport, California air base, to allow aircraft to land safely at night and under zero visibility weather, whether it was rain or heavy fog. The predecessor of today's modern ALS, while crude, had the basics — a 3,500 foot visual approach of 38 towers, with 17 on each side of the runway, and atop each 75 foot high tower a 5000 watt natural gas light.

After the U.S. Navy's development of the lighted towers it was not long before the natural gas lights were soon replaced by more efficient and brighter strobe lights, then called Strobeacon lights. The first large commercial airport to have installed a strobe light ALS visual approach path was New York City's John F. Kennedy International Airport around 1956. Soon other large airports had strobe light ALS systems installed.

== Decision bar ==
All approach lighting systems in the United States utilize a feature called a decision bar. Decision bars are always located 1000 feet away from the threshold in the direction of the arriving aircraft, and serve as a visible horizon to ease the transition from instrument flight to visual flight.

Approach lighting systems are designed to allow the pilot to quickly and positively identify visibility distances in Instrument meteorological conditions. For example, if the aircraft is at the middle marker, and the middle marker is located 3600 feet from the threshold, the decision bar is 2600 feet ahead. If the procedure calls for at least half a statute mile flight visibility (roughly 2600 feet), spotting the decision bar at the marker would indicate enough flight visibility to continue the procedure.

The shorter bars before and after the decision bar are spaced either 100 feet or 200 feet apart, depending on the ALS type. The number of short bars the pilot can see can be used to determine flight visibility. Approaches with lower minimums use the more precise 100-foot spacing systems for more accurate identification of visibility.

== Configurations ==
There are many different variations of the approach lighting system (ALS), many of which feature distinctive lighting configurations, implemented for maximum operational advantage. Several ALS configurations are recognized by the International Civil Aviation Organization (ICAO). Non-standard ALS configurations are installed at some airports. Typically, approach lighting systems are of high-intensity. Many approach lighting systems are also complemented by various on-runway light systems, such as runway end identifier lights (REIL), touchdown zone lights (TDZL), and high intensity runway lights (HIRL). The most common approach light system configurations include the following:

Name	Description
ALSF-1	High-intensity approach lighting system with sequenced flashing lights, configuration 1
ALSF-2	High-intensity approach lighting system with sequenced flashing lights, configuration 2
MALS	Medium-intensity approach lighting system
MALSF	Medium-intensity approach lighting system with sequenced flashing lights
MALSR	Medium-intensity approach lighting system with runway alignment indicator lights
SALS	Short approach lighting system
SALSF	Short approach lighting system with sequenced flashing lights
SSALS	Short simplified approach lighting system
SSALF	Short simplified approach lighting system with sequenced flashing lights
SSALR	Short simplified approach lighting system with runway alignment indicator lights, can be operated as a subsystem of ALSF-2 during favorable weather
ODALS	Omnidirectional approach lighting system
HALS	Helicopter approach lighting system
LDIN	Lead-in lighting system, provides guidance along an approach path that is not aligned with the runway, e.g. for the "Canarsie approach" at John F. Kennedy International Airport
NATO Standard	Approach lighting system similar to Calvert I system found at military airports, mainly in NATO member states
Calvert I	British ICAO-compliant category I approach lighting system
Calvert II	British ICAO-compliant category II approach lighting system

In configurations that include sequenced flashing lights, the lights are typically strobes mounted in front of the runway on its extended centerline. These lights flash in sequence, usually at a speed of two consecutive sequences per second, beginning with the light most distant from the runway and ending at the Decision Bar. Runway Alignment Indicator Lights (RAIL) are similar to sequenced flashing lights, except that they end where the steady approach lighting begins.

Sequenced flashing lights and RAIL do not extend past the Decision Bar to avoid distracting the pilot during the critical phase of transitioning from instrument to visual flight. Sequenced flashing lights are sometimes colloquially called the rabbit or the running rabbit.

== See also ==
- Instrument landing system (ILS)
- Optical landing system (OLS)
- Pilot-controlled lighting (PCL)
- Precision approach path indicator (PAPI)
- Runway edge lights (HIRL, MIRL, LIRL)
- Runway end identifier lights (REIL)
- Visual approach slope indicator (VASI)
