= Runway end identifier light =

Airport runway lighting system

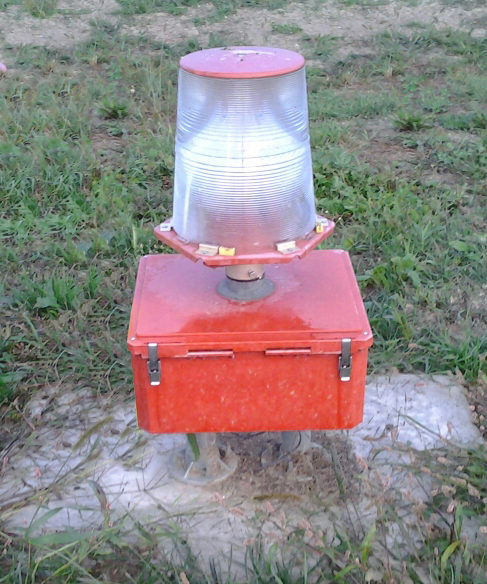
Runway end identifier lights

REIL installed near the runway 19 threshold at Teterboro Airport as seen from an approaching aircraft

Runway end identifier lights (REIL) (ICAO identifies these as Runway Threshold Identification Lights) are installed at many airports to provide rapid and positive identification of the approach end of a particular runway. The system consists of a pair of synchronized flashing lights located laterally on each side of the runway threshold. REILs may be either omnidirectional or unidirectional facing the approach area. They are effective for:

- Identification of a runway surrounded by a preponderance of other lighting
- Identification of a runway which lacks contrast with surrounding terrain
- Identification of a runway during reduced visibility

The International Civil Aviation Organization (ICAO) recommends that:

- Runway threshold identification lights should be installed:
  - at the threshold of a non-precision approach runway when additional threshold conspicuity is necessary or where it is not practicable to provide other approach lighting aids; and
  - where a runway threshold is permanently displaced from the runway extremity or temporarily displaced from the normal position and additional threshold conspicuity is necessary.
- Runway threshold identification lights shall be located symmetrically about the runway centre line, in line with the threshold and approximately 10 meters outside each line of runway edge lights.
- Runway threshold identification lights should be flashing white lights with a flash frequency between 60 and 120 per minute.
- The lights shall be visible only in the direction of approach to the runway.
