= Human rights in the United Kingdom =

Human rights in the United Kingdom concern the fundamental rights in law of every person in the United Kingdom. An integral part of the UK constitution, human rights derive from common law, from statutes such as Magna Carta, the Bill of Rights 1689 and the Human Rights Act 1998, from membership of the Council of Europe, and from international law.

Codification of human rights is recent, but the UK law had one of the world's longest human rights traditions. Today the main source of jurisprudence is the Human Rights Act 1998, which incorporated the European Convention on Human Rights into domestic litigation.

== History ==
The Bill of Rights
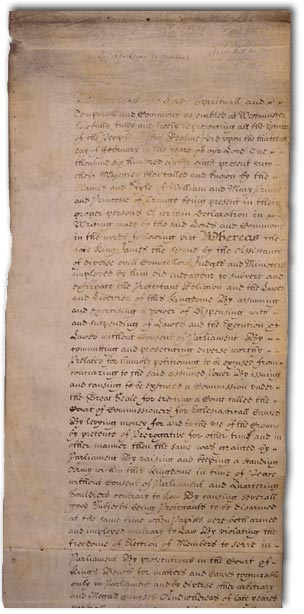
- The Bill of Rights (1689)
- Ratified: 16 December 1689
- Location: Parliamentary Archives
- Author: Parliament of England
- Purpose: Assert certain rights.

Codification of human rights is recent, but before the Human Rights Act 1998 and the European Convention on Human Rights, UK law had one of the world's longest human rights traditions. The Magna Carta 1215 bound the King to require Parliament's consent before any tax, respect the right to a trial "by lawful judgment of his Peers, or by the Law of the Land", stated that "We will sell to no man, we will not deny or defer to any man either Justice or Right", guaranteed free movement for people, and preserved common land for everyone.

It implicitly supported what became the writ of habeas corpus, safeguarding individual freedom against unlawful imprisonment with right to appeal. After the first representative English parliament in 1265, the emergence of petitioning in the 13th century is some of the earliest evidence of parliament being used as a forum to address the general grievances of ordinary people.

During the early 17th century, the Petition of Right 1628 reasserted the values of the Magna Carta against King Charles I. The idea of freely debating rights to political representation took form during the Putney Debates of 1647. After the English Civil War the Bill of Rights 1689 in England and Wales, and the Claim of Rights Act 1689 in Scotland, enshrined principles of representative democracy, no tax without Parliament, freedom of speech in Parliament, and no "cruel and unusual punishment".

Philosophers began to think of rights not as privileges to be granted by the government or the law, but as a fundamental part of what it means to be a person. John Locke (1632–1704), one of the most influential of Enlightenment thinkers, argued that protection of "property" – which to him meant "life, liberty and estates" – were the very reasons that society existed. He articulated that every person is created equal and free but, in return for the advantages of living in an organised society, a person may need to give up some of this freedom.

During the 18th century, the landmark case of Entick v Carrington, following Locke almost exactly, established that the state and government could do nothing that is not expressly provided for by law, and that people could do anything but that which is prohibited by law. In Somerset v Stewart, Lord Mansfield held that slavery was unlawful at common law so that a person who had purportedly been enslaved in Boston, Massachusetts had to be freed in England. This was a severe grievance of southern colonies in the run up to the US Declaration of Independence.

By 1789, ideas of inherent rights had evolved and inspired both the US Bill of Rights, and the Declaration of the Rights of Man and of the Citizen after the American and French Revolutions. Although some labelled natural rights as "nonsense upon stilts", more legal rights were slowly developed by Parliament and the courts. In 1792, Mary Wollstonecraft began the British movement for women's rights and equality, while movements behind the Tolpuddle martyrs and the Chartists drove reform for labour and democratic freedom.

Upon the catastrophe of World War II and the Holocaust, the new international law order put the Universal Declaration of Human Rights 1948 at its centre, enshrining civil, political, economic, social and cultural rights. Though a UN General Assembly Declaration, not a treaty, the rights are binding jus cogens norms in international law, and the UK ratified two further treaties which recast the Universal Declaration: the International Covenant on Civil and Political Rights and the International Covenant on Economic, Social and Cultural Rights of 1966.

In 1950, the UK co-authored the European Convention on Human Rights, enabling people to appeal to the European Court of Human Rights in Strasbourg even against Acts of Parliament: Parliament has always undertaken to comply with basic principles of international law.

Because this appeals process was long, Parliament legislated to "bring rights home" with the Human Rights Act 1998, so that people can raise human rights claims in UK courts based on the Convention directly. The Convention contains the rights to life, rights against torture, against forced labour, to marry, to an effective remedy, and the right to suffer no discrimination in those rights. Most case law concerns the rights to liberty, privacy, freedom of conscience and expression, and to freedom of association and assembly. The UK also enshrines rights to fair labour standards, social security, and a multitude of social and economic rights through its legislation.

In May 2019, the British government announced to appoint its first human rights ambassador. Foreign Secretary Jeremy Hunt appointed Rita French, Hunt's former principal private secretary, to promote UK's work at the United Nations Human Rights Council and internationally. In January 2023 the Sunak government announced plans to broaden the scope of the Public Order Bill, which would allow the UK police to prosecute more easily against peaceful protest, if the government deems such protest to be "disruptive", forcing deemed protestors to wear tracking devices even if unprosecuted. Human Rights activists have accused the bill of being authoritarian.

A report by the Trump administration released in August 2025 claimed the human rights situation in the United Kingdom had worsened over the past year, citing restrictions on freedom of expression and antisemitic threats. The report criticised laws restricting political speech deemed "hateful" or "offensive", highlighting the government’s response to unrest following the July 2024 Southport attacks, in which three girls were killed. Online misinformation about the attacker led to violent protests, and authorities took legal action against those spreading false claims or inciting violence.

Other concerns included "buffer zone" laws preventing protests near abortion clinics, introduced in Scotland, England, and Wales in late 2024. The conviction of activist Livia Tossici-Bolt for holding a sign outside a Bournemouth clinic was cited as a troubling example by Vice-president JD Vance and the US State Department. The UK government responded that it was committed to protecting free speech while ensuring public safety. The report acknowledged that the UK upheld laws protecting freedom of association, collective bargaining, and the right to strike.

== European Convention on Human Rights ==
The UK played an important role in the drafting of the Convention, with figures such as Arthur Goodhart, John Foster and the UK-based Hersch Lauterpacht providing the impetus for the creation of the Council of Europe in 1949 as a means of guarding against the rise of new dictatorships and to provide the citizens of Soviet-occupied countries with a beacon of hope. The initiative in producing a legally binding human rights agreement had already been taken by the International Council of the European Movement, an organisation whose cause had been championed by Winston Churchill and Harold Macmillan, and whose international juridical section (counting Lauterpacht and Maxwell Fyfe amongst its members) had produced a draft convention.

Chaired by Maxwell Fyfe and the former French Resistance leader Pierre-Henri Teitgen, the Legal Committee of the Council of Europe's Consultative Assembly proposed that the Council's Committee of Ministers draw up a convention which would take in and ensure the effective enjoyment of the rights proclaimed in the United Nations' Universal Declaration of Human Rights of 10 December 1948, as well as establishing a European Court and Commission of Human Rights. The Committee agreed and the text of what was to become the European Convention of Human Rights was in the main drafted by Sir Oscar Dowson, a retired senior legal adviser to the Home Office.

=== Ratification ===
There was reluctant support for the Convention back in the UK where Attlee's Labour government was in office. The Lord Chancellor Jowitt, the Colonial Secretary Griffiths and the Chancellor Sir Stafford Cripps disapproved of ratification on the basis of the loss of sovereignty that would result. Jowitt also saw a threat to the domestic system of common law and the risk in allowing judgments to be made by an unknown foreign court. He nevertheless believed that ratification was necessary from a political point of view as a refusal would be, in his view, difficult to justify at home and abroad.

Political pressure aside, the overall government view was that the Convention was only aimed at preventing a totalitarian takeover and not human rights issues within a functioning democracy. In essence, it was thought that Britain had little to lose from ratification but rejection could risk some loss of face in Europe. The Convention had more support among Conservative party politicians, in particular Winston Churchill who believed that it could help unify Europe on the basis of the rule of law.

The UK became the first state to deposit its instrument of ratification of the Convention on 8 March 1951, with the Convention taking effect on 3 September 1953 after the tenth ratification was deposited. No legislation was introduced and no steps were taken to give effect to the Convention's rights in domestic law until the passing of the Human Rights Act 1998.

=== Right of petition ===
Two aspects of the Convention gave the United Kingdom's representatives to the Council of Europe cause for concern: the establishment of a European Court of Human Rights and the right of individual petition to the Court. It was thought that the possibility to submit complaints was open to abuse and could be used for political purposes, notably by members of the Communist Party, rather than for genuine grievances. In addition, it was feared that the consequences of accepting individual petition would cause instability in the British colonies as Britain's authority could be undermined. Britain's attempts to exclude the provisions relating to these two issues were unsuccessful but it managed to ensure that they were optional.

The Conservative government elected in 1951 ratified the First Protocol to the ECHR in 1953 relating to the rights to property, education and free elections, but resisted the right of petition on the grounds that the common law would come under scrutiny by an international court. Labour's election in 1964 led to reconsideration of the issue and this time the only senior dissenting voice was that of the Home Secretary, Frank Soskice. Although willing to accept the right of petition, he objected to the compulsory jurisdiction of the Court on the basis that it would deprive the United Kingdom of a degree of flexibility in dealing with petitions and could lead to political embarrassment.

By 1965 a majority of government ministers believed that the Court would not pose a significantly greater threat to national sovereignty or to political survival than the Commission of Human Rights to which the United Kingdom was subject. Further pressure for acceptance came from the British judge and President of the Court, Arnold McNair, 1st Baron McNair, the Secretary General of the Council of Europe Peter Smithers, Terence Higgins MP and various non-governmental organisations.

As had been the case for ratification in 1950, the Labour government concluded in 1965 that there was little to be lost from giving in to the pressure to recognise the Court and the right of petition. In December 1965, Wilson informed the House of Commons that the right of petition would be recognised for an initial period of three years. At the time the government were concerned that the Burmah Oil Company would take advantage of the new right to contest the legality of the War Damage Act 1965, depriving the company of the right to compensation for damage caused during World War II. As recognised by a House of Lords' decision, the acceptance was timed to fall outside the six-month limitation period for challenges to the Act, and the United Kingdom's acceptance explicitly stated that it applied only to claims arising after its effective date. The declarations of acceptance were deposited by Robert Boothby MP with the Secretary General of the Council of Europe on 14 January 1966.

=== Campaign for incorporation ===
The first public call for the incorporation of the Convention into national law was made in 1968 by Anthony Lester who published a pamphlet entitled Democracy and Individual Rights. Then in 1974 Lord Scarman called for an entrenched instrument to challenge the sovereignty of Parliament and protect basic human rights. The following year a Charter of Human Rights was unveiled by the Labour Party National Executive Committee, although this was regarded as insufficient by certain Conservative politicians including Leon Brittan, Geoffrey Howe and Roy Jenkins who saw an entrenched Bill of Rights as more effective in preventing abuses by the executive of individual rights.

In 1976, a draft Bill of Rights was moved in the House of Lords by Lord Wade and in 1978 a House of Lords Select committee published a report recommending incorporation which was debated in the Lords leading to an amendment being moved which was requesting that the government introduce legislation on the matter. Lord Wade succeeded in securing the Lords' approval for a draft bill but it did not make any progress in the Commons where Alan Beith's unsuccessful attempt to secure a second reading was poorly attended. There was concern at the time about judges deciding cases involving human rights which could lead them from their traditionally impartial role to political issues

In 1986 Lord Broxbourne secured the Lords' approval for his incorporation bill, but was unsuccessful in the Commons, even though a second reading had been obtained. Edward Gardner's 1989 bill to incorporate the Convention also failed on its second reading. At the time, official Conservative party policy was in favour of maintaining the existing constitutional arrangements which it saw as ensuring a high standard of protection of individual rights.

By 1991 the momentum for incorporation had grown, garnering support from organisations such as Charter88, Liberty and the Institute for Public Policy Research – the latter two having published proposals for a British Bill of Rights incorporating the rights. Incorporation was also advocated by senior members of the judiciary, both past and present, including Lord Gardiner, Lord Hailsham, Lord Taylor and Lord Bingham, by the Law Society and the Bar Council. Following the election of John Smith as Labour Party leader in 1992, Labour policy towards the Convention – which had been against it before and during the 1992 General Election – began to change in favour of incorporation.

Smith gave a speech on 1 March 1993 entitled "A Citizen's Democracy" in which he called for a "new constitutional settlement, a new deal between the people and the state that puts the citizen centre stage". This was followed by the Labour Party Conference in October 1993 which agreed in a two-stage policy whereby the Convention would be incorporated into law followed by the enactment of a Bill of Rights. It was planned to entrench Convention rights using a "notwithstanding clause" similar to that in Section Thirty-three of the Canadian Charter of Rights and Freedoms, which would have led to the Convention prevailing over legislation passed by Parliament unless stated otherwise. A human rights commission would also be set up to monitor and promote human rights.

In November 1994 Lord Lester introduced a bill in the Lords which was based on the New Zealand Bill of Rights which would give the Convention a similar status in UK law as that accorded to European Community law by allowing courts to disapply future and existing Acts of Parliament which were incompatible with it, imposing a duty on public authorities to comply and making provision for effective remedies including damages for breaches. Introduced during a period of concern over the impact of European Community law on the Parliamentary sovereignty, the bill did not receive support from the Conservative government and failed in the Commons due to lack of time.

On 18 December 1996, the shadow Labour Home Secretary Jack Straw and Paul Boateng published a Consultation Paper headed "Bringing Rights Home" which set out Labour's plans to incorporate the Convention if it won the next election. The paper focused on the first stage of Labour's human rights policy and how the Convention should be incorporated, notably as regards its ability to override statutory law. On 5 March 1997 a Labour and Liberal Democrat Consultative Committee on Constitutional Reform chaired by Robin Cook and Robert Maclennan published a report calling for the creation of a "Human Rights Commissioner" to oversee the operation of the legislation and to bring cases on behalf of those seeking protection of their rights.

=== Passage through Parliament ===
The election of Labour in May 1997 led to the publication of a white paper on the bill – "Rights Brought Home: The Human Rights Bill".

The bill was introduced by Lord Irvine to the House of Lords on 3 November 1997. In response to a question from Lord Simon, Lord Irvine confirmed that the bill did not in fact incorporate the Convention, but rather gave "further effect in the United Kingdom to convention rights". Lord Irvine also rejected a proposed amendment by the Conservative Lord Kingsland which would have had the effect of obliging the domestic courts to apply the case-law of the European Court of Human Rights, stating that the obligation to take it into account was sufficient.

The Liberal Democrats supported the bill, as did several crossbenchers including Lord Bingham, Lord Scarman, Lord Wilberforce, Lord Ackner, Lord Cooke and Lord Donaldson. The bill was opposed by the Conservative Party, although some backbenchers rebelled against the party line, most notably Lord Renton and Lord Windlesham.

The second reading in the House of Commons took place on 16 February 1998 where the bill was introduced by Jack Straw who stated that it was "the first major Bill on human rights for more than 300 years". In addition to the incorporation of the Convention in domestic law, Jack Straw indicated that the bill was intended to have two other significant effects: the modernisation and democratisation of the political system by bringing about "a better balance between rights and responsibilities, between the powers of the state and the freedom of the individual" and the introduction of a culture of awareness of human rights by public authorities.

Amendments rejected included giving courts a greater degree of flexibility with regard to Strasbourg case-law and referring to the margin of appreciation accorded to states by the Court, as well as limiting the obligation to interpret legislation compatibly with Convention rights only when it was 'reasonable' to do so. A successful amendment was tabled by Labour backbencher Kevin McNamara which had the effect of incorporating into the bill Articles 1 and 2 of Protocol 6 of the Convention abolishing the death penalty in peacetime.

The bill successfully negotiated the Commons and the Lords and entered into force on 2 October 2000 as the Human Rights Act 1998.

== Human Rights Act 1998 ==
The Human Rights Act 1998 seeks to give direct effect to the European Convention on Human Rights in domestic law by enabling claimants to bring an action in national courts instead of having to take their case before the European Court of Human Rights, as had previously been the case. The Act makes it unlawful for a public authority to act in a manner contrary to certain rights prescribed by the Convention and allows a UK court to award a remedy in the event of a breach.

A notable pre-Human Rights Act case illustrating the challenges of holding public bodies accountable involved Kelly Davis, a Black builder from Bath, who faced repeated planning refusals by Wansdyke District Council between 1989 and 1991. In 2000, a judge at Bristol County Court found that planning officers had acted in a “consistently unhelpful and obstructive fashion,” concluding that this was likely because Davis was “the only Black builder in Wansdyke.”

In principle, the Act has vertical effect in that it operates only vis-à-vis public bodies and not private parties. There are however certain situations in which the Act can be indirectly invoked against a private person.

Section 3 of the Act requires primary and secondary legislation to be given effect in a way which is compatible with the Convention insofar as this is possible. If the legislation cannot be interpreted in a manner which is compatible, this does not affect its validity, continuing operation or enforcement. In such a situation, section 4 of the Act allows a court to make a declaration of incompatibility which has no direct effect on the legislation nor any practical consequences for the case in which it is made; it allows Parliament to take remedial action without being obliged to do so.

Human rights in Scotland are given legal effect through the Scotland Act 1998. Section 57(2) of the Act states: "A member of the Scottish Executive has no power to make any subordinate legislation, or to do any other act, so far as the legislation or act is incompatible with any of the Convention rights...”

UK human rights legislation has been criticised by some for what they perceive as excessive attention to the human rights of offenders at the expense of those of victims; high-profile cases, such as those of Learco Chindamo and the 2006 Afghan hijackers, have attracted controversy, sparking calls for the review of the Human Rights Act 1998 and other legislation. David Cameron in his second ministry announced plans to replace the Human Rights Act with a "British Bill of Rights".

On 9 May 2022, more than 50 organisations warned the UK government that tearing up the Human Rights Act would have “dire consequences” including removing obligations to properly address violence against women and girls and destabilising peace in Northern Ireland.

== Rights in domestic law ==
Both the common law and the Human Rights Act 1998 are domestic sources of rights. Since 1998, through judicial development, the two have increasingly converged as the dominant view is that the ordinary rules of tort, equity, contract or property can accommodate human rights. As Lord Bingham put it in 2008,

one would ordinarily be surprised if conduct which violated a fundamental right or freedom of the individual did not find a reflection in a body of law ordinarily as sensitive to human needs as the common law, and it is demonstrable that the common law in some areas has evolved in a direction signalled by the Convention...

The modern law contrasts to the older view, represented by A. V. Dicey that "at no time has there in England been any proclamation of the right to liberty of thought or to freedom of speech, [...] it can hardly be said that our constitution knows of such a thing as any specific right of public meeting".

=== Life ===
The common law ensures the protection of the right to life and that no person is deprived of life intentionally. This is achieved primarily through the criminal law and the crimes of murder and manslaughter. Some protection is also offered by the civil law where, for example, the Fatal Accidents Act 1976 allows relatives of those killed by the wrongdoing of others to recover damages. Capital punishment had by 1998 been abolished in respect of all offences. Under the Coroners Act 1988 there is a duty in certain circumstances for deaths to be investigated by a coroner.

The law also attaches importance to the preservation of life: aiding and abetting a suicide is a criminal offence under the Suicide Act 1961 and euthanasia is unlawful (see the Bland case). Furthermore, there is a duty upon medical professionals to keep patients alive unless to do so would be contrary to the patient's best interests based on professional medical opinion (the Bolam Test), taking into account their quality of life in the event that treatment is continued. The Abortion Act 1967 permits the termination of a pregnancy under certain conditions and the Human Fertilisation and Embryology Act 1990 requires the storage of embryos to be licensed.

There is also an obligation on the state to prevent destitution and neglect by providing relief to persons who may otherwise starve to death.

=== No forced labour ===
Slavery was abolished throughout much of the British Empire by the Slavery Abolition Act 1833 but as early as 1706 the common law had recognised that as soon as a slave came to England, he became free. The courts did not recognise contracts which were equivalent to slavery or servitude.

The courts have been reluctant to force individuals to work and have declined to enforce contracts of service. Forced labour is however permitted in certain limited circumstances: the Crown can theoretically compel persons to undertake naval service and prisoners can be forced to work whilst serving their sentences.

The Supreme Court of the United Kingdom considered the forced labour prohibition in Caitlin Reilly and Jamieson Wilson v Secretary of State for Work and Pensions, where it ruled that the Department for Work and Pensions' workfare policy under which the unemployed work in return for their benefit payments were not forced labour but were nevertheless legally flawed.

=== Liberty ===
The right to liberty of the person, to be free from the domination or servitude of others, and only to lose one's liberty 'by lawful judgment of his Peers, or by the Law of the Land' has been fundamental to UK and English law since the Magna Carta. This said, slavery and serfdom took until the 16th century to break down in England, and was maintained at least until 1833 within the British Empire, before full abolition of forced labour was passed, extending the writ of habeas corpus (the right to one's own body) to everyone.

Benjamin Franklin's alleged adage, that people who sacrifice liberty for security will lose both and deserve neither, is reflected in human rights law. Like international law, the European Convention on Human Rights article 5 states no 'one shall be deprived of [their] liberty' unless law expressly allows that person's detention after conviction, a lawful arrest or detention on suspicion of an offence, detention of a minor for education, detention for health or stopping infectious diseases spreading, or for lawful deportation or extradition.

People must be told reasons for any detention, be put on trial in a reasonable time, or released immediately with compensation if detention was unlawful. In practice, every power of the police or the state to maintain order and security 'inevitably means a corresponding reduction in the liberty of the individual', and the UK has among the highest spending on policing in the world. For this reason the Police and Criminal Evidence Act 1984, and the limits to police powers, is a key legislative guardian of liberty in the UK today.

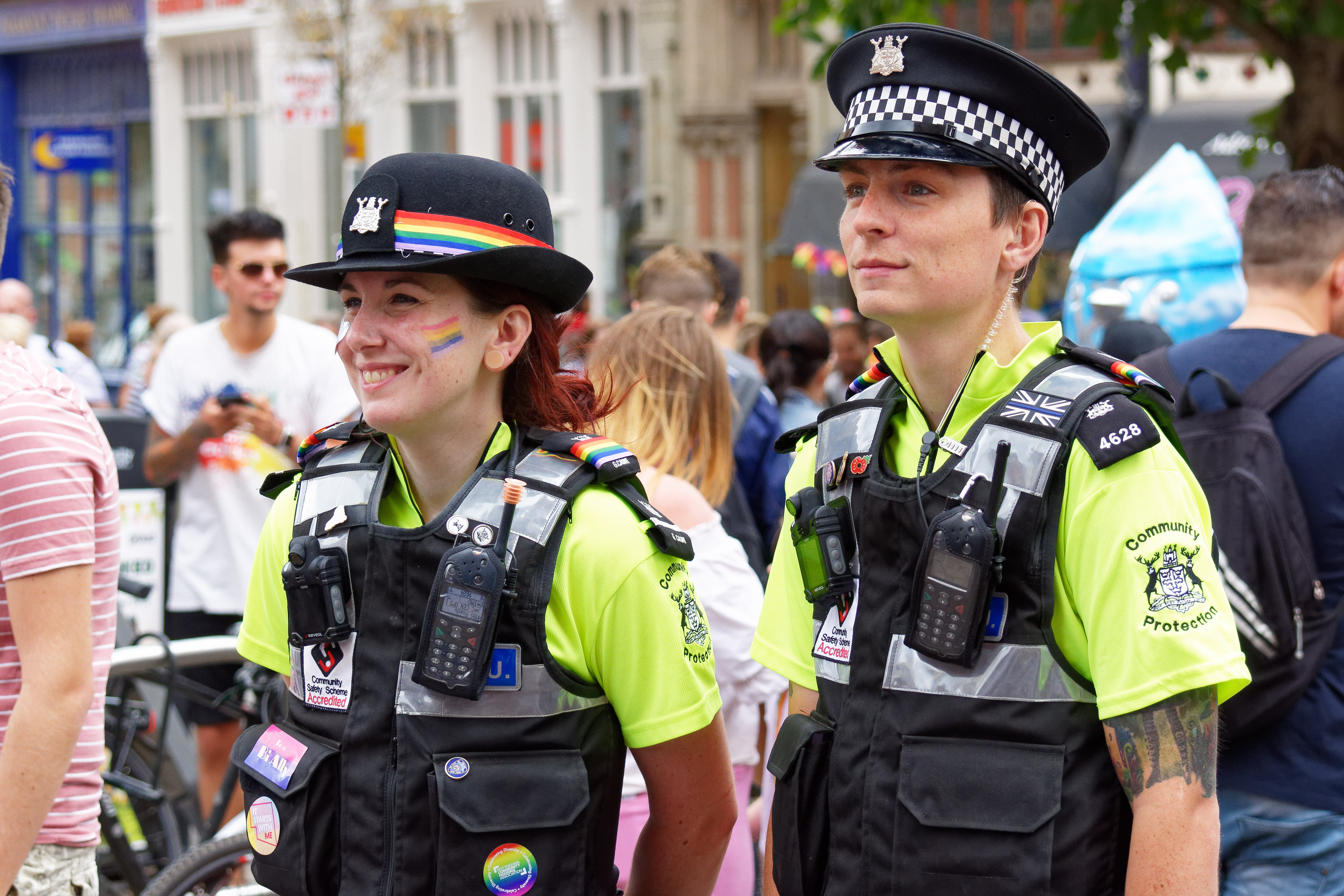
Chief constables can grant limited powers to community support officers including giving a fixed penalty notice, but not the wider search or arrest powers of police.

Three main issues of police power and liberty are (1) powers of arrest, detention and questioning, (2) powers to enter, search or seize property, and (3) the accountability of the police for abuse of power. First, the Police and Criminal Evidence Act 1984 section 1 allows a constable to stop and search people if a constable 'has reasonable grounds for suspecting' that they will 'find stolen or prohibited articles', they may seize the articles, and they may use reasonable force. The constable must give their name, police station, and grounds for the search. People cannot be made to remove clothing in public, except an outer coat, jacket or gloves.

Because of the widespread problem of race discrimination in stop and search, the Home Office Code A says that 'reasonable suspicion cannot be based on generalisations or stereotypical images' of people being involved in crime. It was formerly seen as 'contrary to constitutional principle' to search someone to find whether or not there are grounds for arrest. But since 1994, there is no need for police to show reasonable suspicion to search someone to prevent violence or the carrying of offensive weapons.

In 2015 the Supreme Court held suspicionless searches were held to be compatible with ECHR article 5. Under section 24, constables can arrest people without a warrant if they are committing an offence, or if there are reasonable grounds for suspecting they will. The meaning of 'reasonable grounds' is not exacting, but a police officer must not arrest someone in bad faith, or irrationally, or if a suspect is cooperating and arrest is therefore unnecessary. Otherwise, a justice of the peace may issue a warrant for arrest, require attendance at court, in writing, and it can be executed by a constable. With a warrant, a constable can enter and search premises to make an arrest, or enter and search after an arrest. In addition, any person can make a 'citizens' arrest of another person who is in the act of committing an indictable offence. Anyone being arrested must be told the fact of arrest, and the reasons, or be told as soon as practicable, and if they are not the arrest is unlawful.

People who are arrested must be brought to a police station as soon as practicable, and there must either be released, charged or detained for questioning. People can only be detained without charge for 24 hours, but this can be extended to 36 hours for an indictable offence, or another 36 hours (i.e. 72 hours in total) but only with approval of a magistrate's court where the detainee has a right to legal representation. People can be searched at a police station with an inspector's authority, but can only do intimate searches of orifices if there are reasonable grounds for thinking there is a class A drug or article that could cause injury. A detainee has the right to inform a friend or relative, and consult a solicitor, but this right can be delayed by 36 hours if arrested for an indictable offence or 48 hours for terrorism.

Interviews should be recorded, people can be photographed and drug tested without their consent. 'Intimate' samples of bodily fluids, blood and swabs cannot be taken without consent, but courts may draw adverse inferences. When being questioned by police, it is acknowledged that the right to silence is ultimately 'at the heart' of a fair trial, and 'particular caution [is] required before a domestic court [should] invoke an accused's silence against him.' No statement or confession is admissible unless it is voluntarily given. A clear exception, however, is that a vehicle owner can be required to reveal the identity of a driver, and this does not breach ECHR article 6.

'The great end, for which men entered into society, was to secure their property. That right is preserved sacred and incommunicable in all instances, where it has not been taken away or abridged by some public law... wherein every man by common consent gives up that right, for the sake of justice and the general good. By the laws of England, every invasion of private property, be it ever so minute, is a trespass. No man can set his foot upon my ground without my licence, but he is liable to an action, though the damage be nothing... If no excuse can be found or produced, the silence of the books is an authority against the defendant, and the plaintiff must have judgment.'

— Entick v Carrington [1765] EWHC KB J98, Lord Camden CJ

Second, police officers have no right to trespass upon property without a lawful warrant, because as Lord Camden said in Entick v Carrington by 'the law of England every invasion of private property, be it ever so minute, is a trespass.' Here a sheriff searched and seized property at the home of a journalist, John Entick, but the 'warrant' used by the sheriff had no legal basis. The Court held that the sheriff had to pay damages. Today, under the Police and Criminal Evidence Act 1984 section 8 enables officers to enter premises and search but only based on a warrant granted by a justice of the peace. There is no right to search communications between lawyer and a client, or confidential personal records, some medical materials, and confidential journalistic material, unless there is an order of a judge.

A common law power to enter premises to stop a breach of peace was held in McLeod v UK to have unjustifiably violated the right to privacy under ECHR article 8, because the police used it to help an ex-husband recover property when an ex-wife was absent from a home. Under section 19, an officer can seize material if they have reasonable grounds to believe it was obtained by committing an offence, or if it is evidence, but not if it is subject to legal privilege. Third, although 'the law does not encourage' someone to 'resist the authority of... an officer of the law', there is an inherent right to resist an unlawful arrest, but it is an offence to resist a lawful arrest.

By contrast, before being formally arrested, in R v Iqbal a man accused of drug offences was detained and handcuffed by police while attending a friend's trial, but before being arrested he broke free and escaped. He was caught again, and convicted for escaping lawful custody, but the Lord Chief Justice overturned the conviction because there was no lawful arrest, and the offence could not be widened 'by making it apply to those whose arrest has been deliberately postponed.'

Anyone can bring a claim against police for unlawful conduct, the chief constable is vicariously liable for constables' conduct, and exemplary damages are available for 'oppressive, arbitrary or unconstitutional actions'. Evidence illegally obtained, such as a confession, and certainly anything through 'torture, inhuman or degrading treatment and the use or threat of violence' must be excluded, and a court can refuse evidence if it would have an adverse effect on the fairness of proceedings. Since 2011, Police and Crime Commissioners are directly elected in England and Wales (on low turnouts) and have a duty to 'secure that the police force is efficient and effective'.

The Home Secretary is meant to issue a 'strategic policing document' that chief constables pay regard to, but can intervene and require 'special measures' if there is mismanagement. This means the Home Secretary is ultimately politically responsible, but administration is largely local. Commissioners have a duty to enforce the law, but decisions about how to allocate scarce resources mean that police forces can choose to prioritise tackling some kinds of crime (e.g. violence) over others (e.g. drugs). Generally police forces will not be liable in tort for failing to stop criminal acts, but positive duties do exist to take preventative measures or properly investigate allegations.

Other persons who may be detained include those in need of care and attention under the National Assistance Act 1948 (11 & 12 Geo. 6. c. 29), and children in the care of a local authority in secure accommodation, those suffering from infectious diseases under the Public Health Act of 1984 and those detained by the British Armed Forces abroad. The courts have powers to sentence offenders and deprive them of their liberty, as well as detain mental patients under the provisions of the Mental Health Act 1983. They may also order the payment of compensation to persons who have been unlawfully detained and the Home Secretary may award payments to victims of miscarriages of justice.

=== Fair trial ===
Article 6 of the Convention requires a fair trial, with a presumption of innocence, and legal aid if justice requires it, according to principles of natural justice. Article 7 prohibits criminal offences applying retroactively to acts done before something was made criminal. This follows the law since Magna Carta that everyone has the right to "trial by one's Peers, or the law of the land". Several principles also combine to guarantee an individual a certain level of protection by law.

These are often known as the rules of natural justice and comprise the principles nemo iudex in causa sua and audi alteram partem. A fair hearing implies that each party has the opportunity to present their own case to an impartial tribunal. Courts must generally sit in public and decisions may be challenged on the grounds of actual or apparent bias. Although judges are under a common law duty to give reasons for their decisions, there is no such rule for non-judicial decision-makers.

Certain specific rights apply in criminal cases. Persons in custody have the right to consult a solicitor by virtue of the Police and Criminal Evidence Act 1984 and the Access to Justice Act 1999 allows an individual to request confidential and free legal advice. The prosecution is under a common law duty to disclose all relevant evidence including that which may assist the defendant. The accused also benefits from a limited right to silence and the privilege against self-incrimination.

Confessions are admissible as evidence under certain conditions laid down in the Police and Criminal Evidence Act 1984. The accused additionally benefits from a presumption of innocence. In discharging the burden of proof, the onus is on the prosecution as established in Woolmington v DPP. For example, in R v Wang it was held that it was never permissible for a judge to direct a jury to find a defendant guilty. There is also a right to jury trial, the accused should be able to follow proceedings and they have a right to be present during proceedings. The application of the double jeopardy rule was limited by the Criminal Justice Act 2003.

Courts have jurisdiction to prevent abuses of process if it would be unfair to try a defendant or a fair trial would not be possible.

=== Privacy ===
The constitutional importance of privacy, of one's home, belongings, and correspondence, has been recognised since 1604, when Sir Edward Coke wrote that the 'house of every one is to him as his castle and fortress'. Today it is clear that common law recognises "the tort of invasion of privacy". While rights to liberty and a fair trial also protect against unjustified search or seizure, the European Convention on Human Rights article 8 enshrines the right to one's 'private and family life', 'home' and 'correspondence' unless interference is 'in accordance with the law' and 'necessary in a democratic society' for public security, safety, economic well-being, preventing crime, protecting health or morals or rights of others.

The law of trespass, as in Entick v Carrington, traditionally protected against unjustified physical violations of people's homes, but given extensive powers of entry, and with modern information technology the central concerns of privacy are electronic surveillance, both by the state and by private corporations aiming to profit from data or 'surveillance capitalism'. The four main fields of law relating to privacy concern (1) listening devices and interference with private property, (2) interception of mail, email or web communications by government, (3) mass data storage and processing by corporations or state bodies, and (4) other breaches of confidence and privacy, particularly by the press.

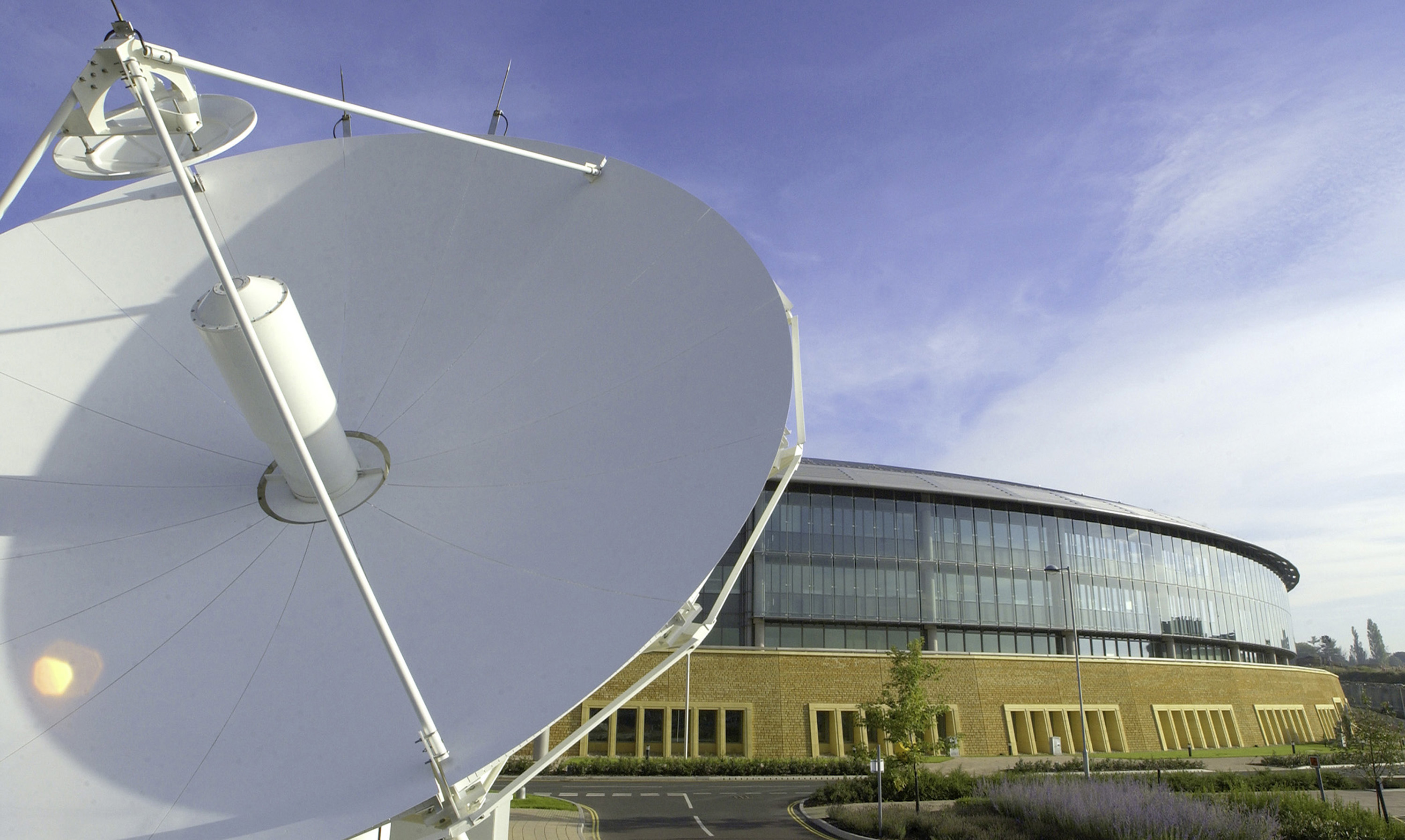
Government Communications HQ, part of UK intelligence, is among the public bodies which can apply for warrants to put people under surveillance to detect serious crime. With the Investigatory Powers Act 2016 these powers have steadily grown.

First, the Police Act 1997 sections 92 prohibits 'interference with property or with wireless telegraphy' without authorisation by a chief constable or others. Such listening or bugging devices may only be used 'for the prevention or detection of serious crime' that could lead to over 3 years of jail. A judicial commissioner's approval is further needed if a dwelling, bedroom or office is being bugged, and if refused the police can appeal to the Investigatory Powers Commissioner.

On top of this, the Regulation of Investigatory Powers Act 2000 which also generally allows surveillance by police, intelligence, HMRC and councils to obtain private information ('directed'), or surveillance of a residence or vehicle ('intrusive') if for the purpose of national security, preventing serious crime, or protecting UK economic well-being. Only 'intrusive' surveillance requires approval by a judicial commissioner. This has frequently led to abuse, for instance, in one case with a family being put under surveillance to see if they lived in a catchment area of an oversubscribed school, and in another an intelligence officer infiltrating a protest group and fathering a child, after taking a dead child's identity.

Surveillance in public places does not engage the human right to privacy, according to Kinloch v HM Advocate, where evidence of the defendant money laundering was gathered by police following the suspect in public spaces. Second, although the Investigatory Powers Act 2016 section 2 creates a duty to consider whether means less intrusive to privacy could be used, warrants can be issue for targeted or bulk interception of any data, including to assist other governments, but only to detect serious crime, protect national security, or protect the UK's economic well-being, and this must be proportionate. Applications are made to the Home Secretary or other appropriate ministers, and must be approved by a judicial commissioner with written reasons for any refusal.

Warrants can be issued against Members of Parliament with the consent of the prime minister. Interception should not be disclosed in judicial proceedings. Local councils are able to carry out interceptions, albeit with authority of a justice of the peace. Journalists' material can be intercepted, though only with authority of a judicial commissioner. The government can also require internet service providers retain data, including bulk data, for up to a year. Judicial commissioners must have held high judicial office, while the Investigatory Powers Commissioner audits, inspects and investigates the exercise of public body powers. In 2015, over 3059 warrants were granted, and it is argued by MI5 that bulk data enables security services to 'make the right connections between disparate pieces of information'. The fact of bulk data collection, however, inevitably means people who have nothing to do with serious crime remain under state surveillance.

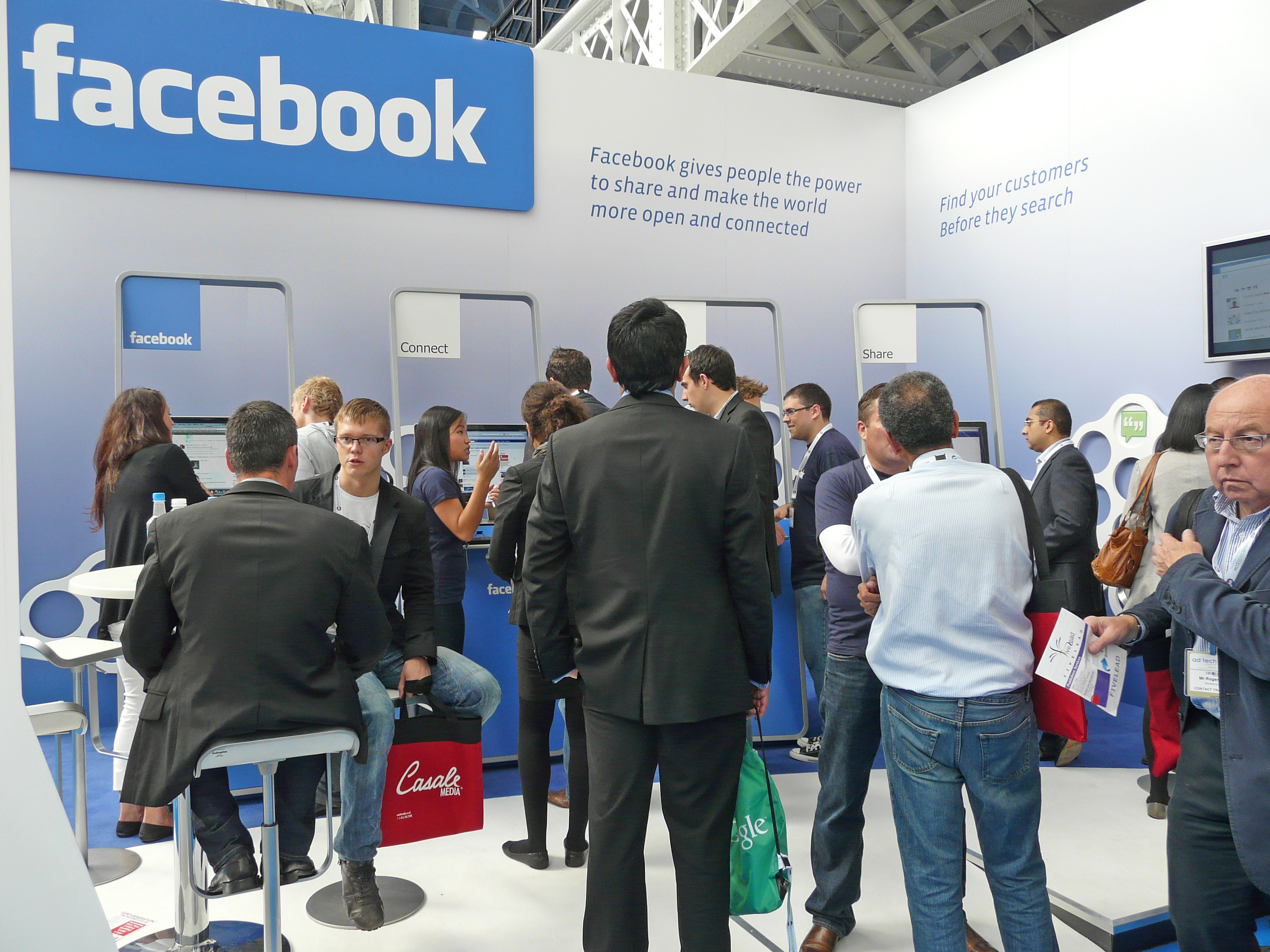
The world's biggest tech corporations, particularly Facebook, Google, Amazon, Microsoft and Apple have vast databases on user behaviour. In 2016, a scandal broke as it was found Facebook and other data was illegally taken and used for psychologically targeted adverts in the 2016 Brexit poll. The GDPR 2016 creates minimal data rights.

Third, it has been recognised that the 'right to keep oneself to oneself, to tell other people that certain things are none of their business, is under technological threat' also from private corporations, as well as the state. Through standard form contracts, tech corporations routinely appropriate users' private data for targeted advertising, particularly Google (e.g. search and browsing history, email, locations), Facebook (e.g. personal interactions, hobbies, messages), Microsoft (e.g. emails, or cloud documents) and others. Because people have no choice but to agree to the terms and conditions, consent is defective and contract terms are often unfair, legislation has been increasing in strength to reflect the fundamental 'right to the protection of personal data' in the European Union.

The General Data Protection Regulation 2016 requires that all data is processed lawfully, fairly and transparently, and on the basis of 'consent' or a contract. The meaning of 'consent' requires more than the basic rules for commercial contracts, and must be clearly and distinctly identifiable, and revocable at any time. Contract terms may be subject to more protective rights contained in UK law. Whenever a 'data subject' has personal data processed or stored, they have basic rights to be provided with transparent information about the data stored including when they have not given that information themselves, to access the data and rectify any inaccuracies, and to demand that the data is erased when it is no longer necessary for the purpose for which it was originally given.

There is a further right that data must be portable 'to another controller without hindrance', for instance in switching phone contacts. Data may be disclosed for legitimate reasons, so in Rugby Football Union v Consolidated Information Services Ltd the Supreme Court held that a ticketing agency had no data protection defence against disclosing information to the Rugby Football Union about people who touted tickets against its rules, because the legitimate interest in stopping theft was stronger.

Article 32 states a data controller must ensure the security of people's data, and notify supervisory authorities of any breach, including transfers to 'third countries' where the rule of law is defective. However, during the 2016 Brexit referendum the House of Commons fake news committee found that Facebook enabled massive breaches of users' data, being sold onto third parties including Cambridge Analytica, which psychologically targeted voters with political adverts, and this data spread into Russia.

The penalties for breach of GDPR rules, since it came into force in May 2018, can be up to 4% of a company's worldwide turnover, or €20m, whichever is higher. There are also databases kept by UK state bodies, including the National Domestic Extremism Database, a DNA Database, and a Police National Computer, Related to this, the Supreme Court held in R(L) v Metropolitan Police Commissioner that there was no breach of privacy when a primary school's enhanced criminal record check on an applicant for a teaching assistant job showed the applicant's son was put on a child protection register because of neglect, and she was refused a job.

A planned NHS patients' database, care.data, was abandoned because of protests about confidentiality and security of data. Finally, claimants may sue any private party on the grounds of breach of confidence, an old equitable action, although one that may be giving way to a tort of misuse of private information. For instance, it was held that it was an unlawful breach of privacy for the Daily Mail to publish private journals of the Prince of Wales about the handover of Hong Kong to China stolen and leaked by a former employee. It was also held to be unlawful for a newspaper to publish details of an applicant's private sexual life, even though in other countries the story had spread around the internet, because there was no 'public interest... in the disclosure or publication of purely private sexual encounters, even though they involve adultery or more than one person at the same time'. In this way the common law has developed to uphold human rights.

=== Thought, conscience and religion ===
Article 9 states that everyone has the right to freedom of conscience, including religion and belief. Only the manifestation of a belief can be limited on justifiable legal grounds as strictly necessary in a democracy.

By contrast, the common law historically required punishment for "erroneous opinions concerning rites or modes of worship" to be provided for in legislation before it could be applied. There were a number of such laws in the 17th and 18th centuries, including the Corporation Act 1661 requiring holders of civic office to be members of the Church of England and the Test Act 1673 requiring holders of military or civil functions to take the oaths of supremacy and allegiance and subscribe to a declaration against transubstantiation.

Both Acts were repealed by the Roman Catholic Relief Act 1829 which admitted Catholics into the legal profession and permitted Catholic schools and places of worship. Jews were allowed to enter Parliament under the Jews Relief Act 1858. The Succession to the Crown Act 2013 amended the Act of Settlement 1701 to remove the exclusion from the line of succession of those who married Catholics. However, it remains the case that the Sovereign must be a member of the Church of England.

Unlike the Church of Scotland and Church in Wales, the Church of England is the established church in England and enjoys certain privileges and rights in law. However, the promotion of anti-Christian views is no longer illegal and the law places no formal restrictions on the freedom of worship. There is no formal legal definition of religion and courts generally abstain from deciding issues of religious doctrine. The common law offences of blasphemy and blasphemous libel were abolished by the Criminal Justice and Immigration Act 2008. A new offence of incitement to religious hatred was created by the Racial and Religious Hatred Act 2006 and discrimination on the grounds of religion is regulated by the Employment Equality (Religion or Belief) Regulations 2003.

The Military Service Act 1916 and the National Service (Armed Forces) Act 1939 both provided for the possibility of exemption from military service on the basis of conscientious objection, although the House of Lords has held that there would be no breach of human rights if such a possibility was not provided for.

=== Expression ===
The right to freedom of expression is generally seen as being the 'lifeblood of democracy.' After the English Civil War, it was established that a jury could acquit a Quaker who preached to a crowd even against the judge's direction and 'against full and manifest evidence'.

The Bill of Rights 1689 article 9 guaranteed the 'freedom of speech and debates or proceedings in Parliament' and stated they were 'not to be impeached or questioned in any court or place out of Parliament', but the first full, legal guarantees for free speech came from the American Revolution, when the First Amendment to the US Constitution guaranteed 'freedom of speech'. The government and employers suppressed free speech through the French revolution and after the Napoleonic wars, until the repeal of the anti-Catholic laws, and the abolition of restraints on trade union organising, as well as throughout the British Empire.

After World War II, the UK signed the Universal Declaration on Human Rights, and joined the European Convention. Article 10 enshrines the right to freedom of expression which includes the rights 'to hold opinions and to receive and impart information and ideas without interference by public authority and regardless of frontiers.' This does not prevent 'the licensing of broadcasting, television or cinema enterprises.' Like all other rights these are subject to restrictions set out in law, and as necessary in a democratic society, to stop crime, or protect security, territorial integrity, safety, health, morals, the rights of others, and to maintain the judiciary's impartiality.

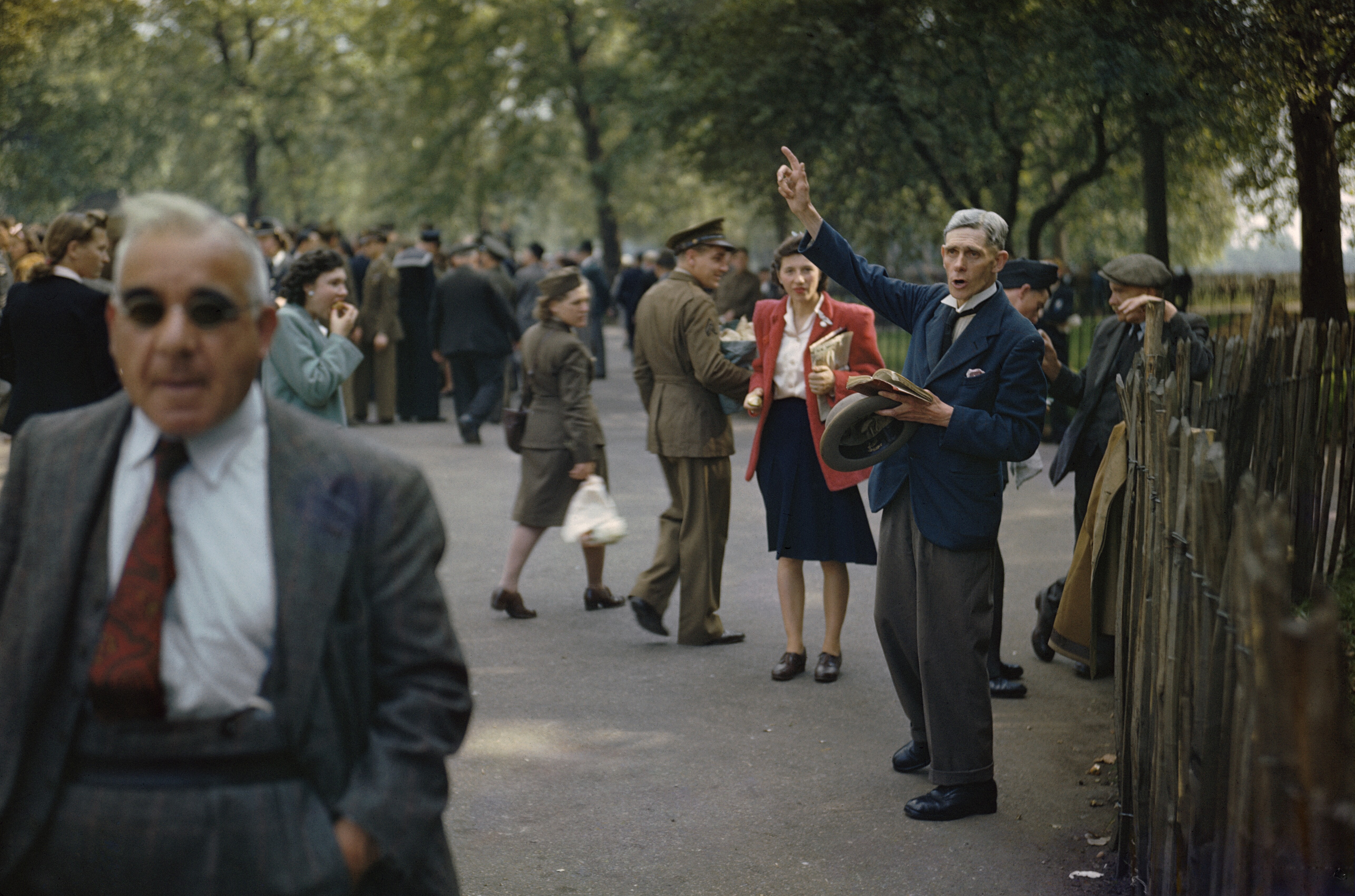
At Speakers' Corner of Hyde Park, London, here in 1944, people traditionally gather to exchange views, debate, and listen. Debating and free speech societies are found throughout the UK and make a regular part of TV.

The practical right to free expression is limited by (1) unaccountable ownership in the media, (2) censorship and obscenity laws, (3) public order offences, and (4) the law of defamation and breach of confidence. First, although anybody can stand on Speakers’ Corner, in Parliament Square, or in Trafalgar Square and speak freely to a crowd, the communication channels with the biggest audiences are owned by large corporate entities: three internet media networks, five television networks, and six corporate owned newspaper groups, almost all of which aim have shareholders that demand to make a profit.

This means that most speech, with most reach, is designed to be compatible with generating advertising revenue and shareholder profit for the newspaper, TV, or internet corporation, and controllers choose which speech or images are acceptable, unless the law creates different rights. While there are loose limits on cross-ownership of TV and newspapers, there is no regulation yet separate advertising business and internet media platforms where their interests conflict with public goals. The Communications Act 2003 sections 319–321, regulates television (but not explicitly internet broadcasts, or newspapers) to ensure that diverse views are heard, and to restrict discriminatory viewing, or the stop misleading information, and allows a complaints procedure.

The UK's transparent, and publicly accountable system of TV media regulation is consistently held to be compatible with freedom of expression. Two of the UK's TV networks, the BBC and Channel 4, are publicly owned and accountable, through an arm's length appointment process overseen by the government. However most television channels are funded through advertising revenue. There is also effectively no regulation of standards on internet media, although the House of Commons committee on fake news called for the same regulation as on TV to be applied after Facebook data theft and psychologically targeted political ads were used by ‘Vote Leave’ in the 2016 Brexit poll.

Second, censorship and obscenity laws have been a highly traditional limit on freedom of expression. The Theatres Act 1968 prohibits obscenity in plays, that is 'indecent, offensive, disgusting or injurious to morality' but with a defence in the public good, while the Video Recordings Act 1984 section 9 makes it illegal to supply of a video without a classification certificate, which is graded according to sexual or violent activity. Obscene publications, since early common law, have been banned although the idea of what is 'obscene' has changed from Victorian values.

The Obscene Publications Act 1959 defines 'obscene' as having the effect to 'deprave and corrupt' people, and allows police or the Director of Public Prosecutions to search and seize obscene material, subject to a defence for literary, artistic, scientific or other merit. Pornography, but also non-sexual gay literature, was suppressed until the 1990s, There are around 70 cases each year, but today the Criminal Prosecution Service Guidelines only recommend charges for 'extreme' cases. The controversial Digital Economy Act 2017, which would have required age verification on the basis of protecting children to access all pornographic websites, by requiring companies take bank card details, has been repeatedly delayed. Third, there are three main public order offences, based on incitement to disaffection, racial hatred, and terrorism.

Disaffection means attempting to persuade the armed forces, police, or others, to revolt or even withhold services. Racial hatred means 'hatred against a group of persons defined by reference to colour, race, nationality (including citizenship) or ethnic or national origins', and it is an offence to threaten, abuse or insult anyone, including through displays, to stir up racial hatred. The same idea extends to religious hatred, sexual orientation and in practice disability. In international law, it is also explicit, that advocacy of hatred includes 'incitement to discrimination' (as well as hostility or violence).

The Terrorism Act 2006 defines incitement to terrorism as 'direct or indirect encouragement or other inducement' for 'commission, preparation or instigation of acts of terrorism', as well as glorifying terrorist acts (that is 'any form of praise or celebration') punishable with 7 years in prison. Fourth, the laws of defamation and breach of confidence are designed to balance people's reputations and rights to privacy. The Defamation Act 2013 states that defamation means a statement that has or would 'cause serious harm to the reputation of the claimant', and if that claimant is a profit making body this requires 'serious financial loss'.

The truth is always a defence for stating something factual, and a defendant may always show their statement 'is substantially true', or that they made a statement of honest opinion, rather than an assertion of fact. Further, of the statement is in the public interest, it will not be unlawful. Connected to this, news outlets should ask someone who is a subject of a story for their side. Internet operators are liable for statements on their websites that are defamatory if the poster is hard to identify, and they fail on a notice by the claimant to remove the statement within 48 hours. There can be no claim for defamation if a defendant has the 'absolute privilege' of making a statement in Parliament or reports, in the course of high state duty, internal documents or a foreign embassy, or reports of courts' proceedings.

There is also 'qualified privilege' which gives a defence to defamation, but only if the writer asks the subject for an explanation or contradiction, for any legislative proceedings outside the UK, public enquiries, non-UK government documents, and matters of an international organisation. Given the global nature of media, a claim in the UK must ensure that the UK is the 'most appropriate place', there is no long trial by jury, and courts can order removal of claims from many websites if it has spread. Claims for breach of confidence are meant to protect the right to privacy. Examples have included an injunction against a retired security service officer who wrote a book called Spycatcher that revealed official secrets. But the government lost its claim to have an injunction against a newspaper on the effects of thalidomide on new births.

The courts have stated that there is no difference between the protection offered by the common law, and that guaranteed by the European Convention on Human Rights.

=== Association and assembly ===
The rights to freedom of association and freedom of assembly are central to the functioning of democracy because they are the basis for political organisation and discourse. Political parties, trade unions, social campaign groups, and businesses all associate freely in democratic societies, and take action upon that freedom, including through assemblies, strikes, or protests. Also protected in international law, the European Convention on Human Rights article 11 states: 'Everyone has the right to freedom of peaceful assembly and to freedom of association with others' including joining 'trade unions for the protection of' their interests. Like with other rights, this cannot be restricted without a lawful justification, that goes no further than necessary in a democratic society, to protect security, safety, health or other people's rights.

Generally, the right to freedom of association involves three main principles. First, there is a right to suffer no disadvantage for associating with others, for instance, because if an employer penalises workers for joining a trade union. Second, one must be able to associate with others on the terms one wishes so that, for example, a political party or a trade union must be able to admit or expel members based on their political values and actions. The flip side of this is that common law recognises a right not to be unjustly excluded from an association. For instance in Nagle v Feilden a horse trainer, Florence Nagle successfully claimed that the Jockey Club's refusal to grant her a training licence on grounds of her sex was unlawful.

Third, there is a right to act upon the goals of the association, for instance by campaigning for election as a political party, or as a trade union collectively bargaining with an employer for better wages or if necessary going on strike. UK law generally imposes no restriction on people forming groups for political purposes, with the significant exception of organisations banned under the Terrorism Act 2000, such as the neo-Nazi white hate group National Action, Jihadi fundamentalists in Al Qaeda, Irish republican and Ulster loyalist paramilitaries, and the protest group Palestine Action.

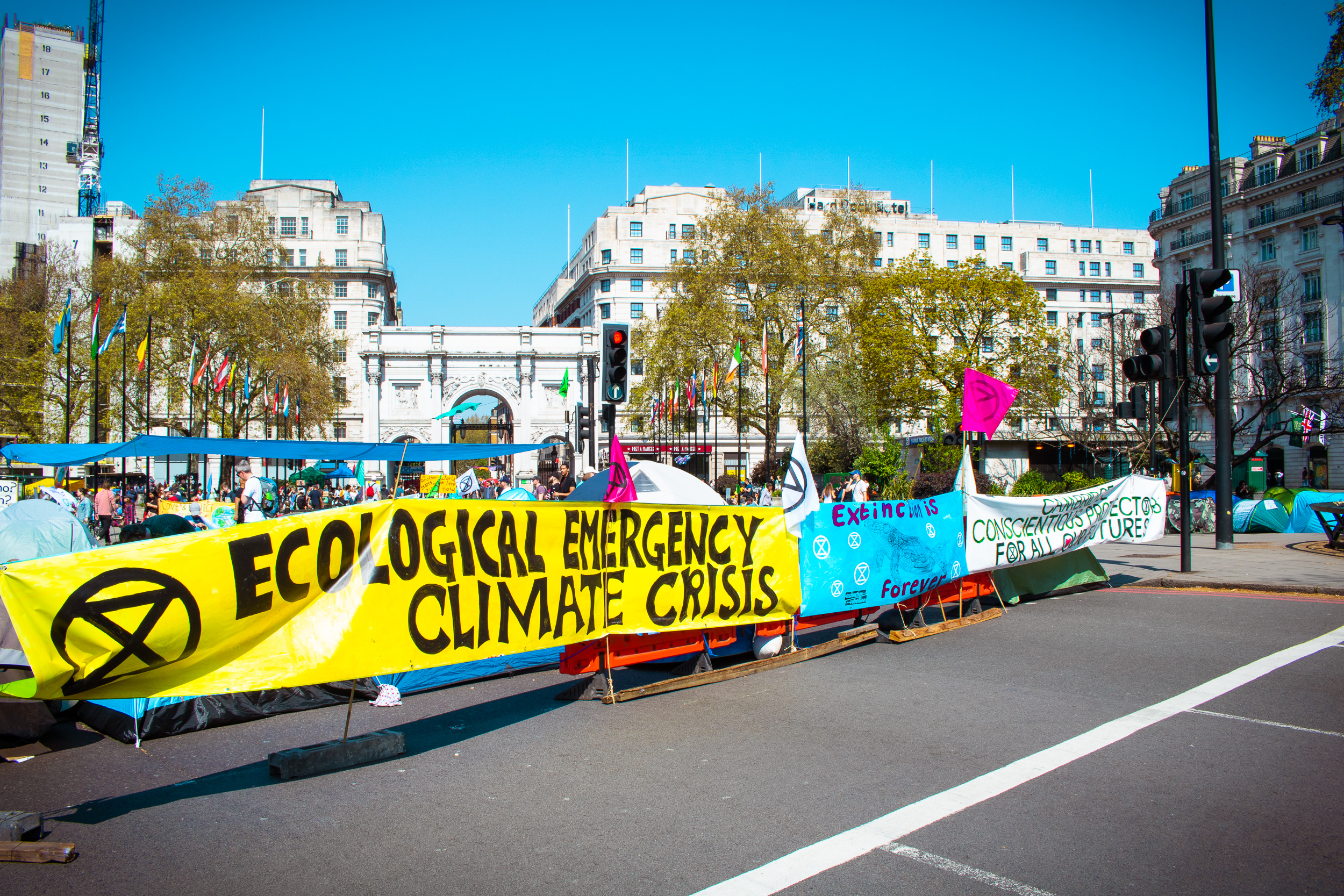
Extinction Rebellion protests in London, 2019

Like freedom of association, the right of peaceful assembly was recognised at common law. For instance, in Beatty v Gillbanks the Salvation Army wanted to march against alcohol but was stopped by the police over concerns that a rival 'skeleton army' of local brewers would violently disrupt them and so breach the beach. The court held that nobody could 'say that such an assembly [was] in itself an unlawful one' and said there was 'no authority' for saying anyone 'may be convicted for doing a lawful act'. As Lord Denning summarised in 1981, freedom of assembly "is the right for everyone to meet and assemble with his fellows to discuss their affairs and to promote their views".

Any procession in the streets or highways is lawful, although there is a duty to inform police 6 days in advance if it is to demonstrate for a cause. This said, in Kay v Metropolitan Police Commissioner the House of Lords held that a regular cycling protest called Critical Mass required no notification because under the Public Order Act 1986 section 11(2) it was "commonly or customarily held" and it did not have a planned route.

Although the Highways Act 1980 section 137 makes it an offence to obstruct a highway, in DPP v Jones the House of Lords held that protestors who assembled on roads around Stonehenge despite police ordering them to disperse from a four-mile radius, could not be lawfully arrested or convicted, because their occupation was 'not inconsistent with the primary right of the public to pass and repass.' This established that peaceful meetings may be held on a highway so long as they do not restrict access by other road users. As well as rights to use public spaces, the law creates positive rights to use public property, such as school halls, for public political meetings.

Universities have a special duty, imposed in 1986, to 'ensure that freedom of speech within the law is secured for members... and for visiting speakers' and not denied use of premises based on their views or objectives. This does not mean, however, that student societies cannot protest or that universities cannot prohibit speakers based on likely threats to property or good order. Anomalously it was held in Hubbard v Pitt that an estate agent might be able to sue a group of protestors in the tort of private nuisance for giving out leaflets and displaying placards opposed to it, on the ground that frustrated its business. Lord Denning MR dissented, and would have held the protestors used the highway reasonably, there was no nuisance at common law, and any picket was lawful if to obtain or communicate information for peaceful persuasion. Whenever a picket is made in the "contemplation or furtherance of a trade dispute" it is lawful, so mushroom workers leafleting customers outside a supermarket to boycott their employers' mushrooms acted lawfully even though it caused the employers economic loss.

The right to assembly does not yet extend to private property. In Appleby v UK the Court of Human Rights held there was no interference in ECHR article 11 when the owners of a private shopping mall in Washington, Tyne and Wear excluded protestors collecting signatures to stop the loss of open space from their mall. Although UK law could provide more protection than the minimum European level, it does not, and makes it an offence under the Criminal Law Act 1977 to enter 'any premises' without leave, or threaten violence to secure entry. For 'residential premises' it is also an offence to remain as a trespasser after being required to leave. Further, a law dating from 1875, still makes it an offence to 'wrongfully and without legal authority... watch and beset' premises. In R v Jones, Jones entered a Royal Air Force base intending to damage military equipment during the 2003 invasion of Iraq, which was itself a violation of international law. The House of Lords held that it was no defence even if the invasion was itself unlawful in international law, and there was still a conspiracy to cause criminal damage in violation of the Criminal Law Act 1977 section 1.

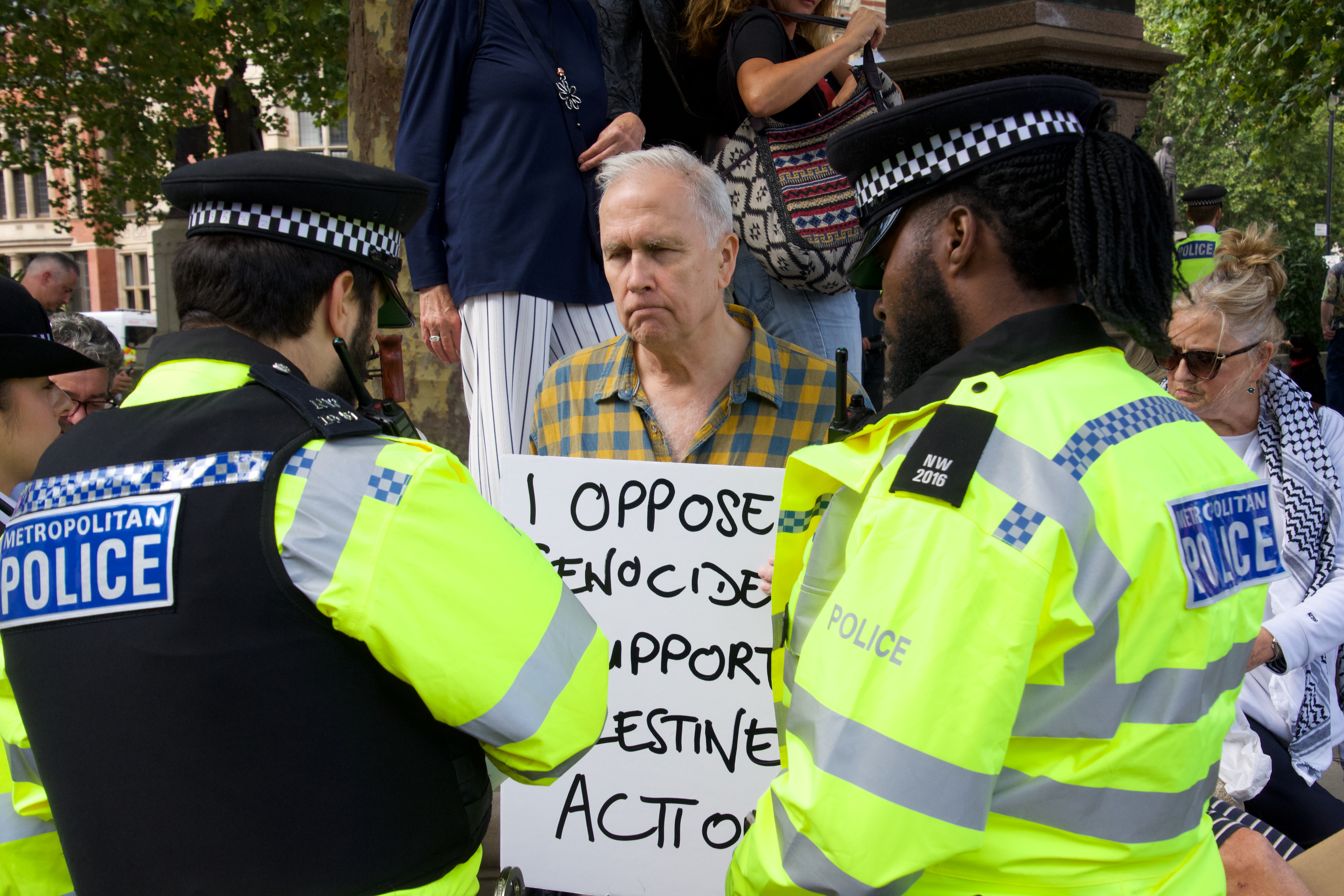
Metropolitan Police making arrests at a Palestine Action protest in London, 6 September 2025

The Criminal Justice and Public Order Act 1994 also makes it an offence to trespass and reside, disrupt or quat on premises without the owner's consent. Genuine belief in the importance of the cause is no defence, and an injunction can be obtained for violations. however, in all of these offences the human right of freedom of assembly or expression of the protesters must be taken into account.

There are four further significant public order offences. First, it is unlawful to riot, where 12 or more people use or threaten unlawful violence. Second, using threatening, abusive or insulting words or behaviour, including on signs, is an offence if this could make people believe they will suffer immediate unlawful violence, or if it causes or is likely to cause "harassment, alarm or distress."

Insults did not include anti-apartheid protests at Wimbledon that spectators resented, and did not include books, such as Salman Rushdie's The Satanic Verses where the immediacy of any result is lacking. Third, harassment is an offence under the Protection from Harassment Act 1997 section 4 if it causes someone to fear on two or more occasions that violence will be used against them. Fourth, while breach of peace is not an offence itself, apprehension is grounds for arrest. This has included selling a National Front paper outside a football ground, and a homophobic preacher holding signs in Bournemouth saying 'Stop Immorality', 'Stop Homosexuality' and 'Stop Lesbianism'.

Generally the police may arrest people who they honestly and reasonably think will risk a breach of the peace, but in R (Laporte) v Gloucestershire Chief Constable the House of Lords held it was unlawful for police to stop a coach of demonstrators from travelling to RAF Fairford and turn it back to London. There was no evidence a breach of peace was imminent. It regarded freedom of assembly as a residual right which individuals are free to exercise so long as the law does not preclude them from doing so. By contrast, in Austin v United Kingdom the European Court of Human Rights held there was no breach of article 5, the right to liberty, when protestors were kettled in Oxford Circus without food or drink for 7 hours. They were held not to have been falsely imprisoned and the conduct was justified to stop breach of the peace. Arguments were not, however, made under article 11. This said, the police must use their 'operational discretion' at all times with regard to human rights.

=== Marriage ===
There is no general right to marry. The necessary formalities in the Marriage Act 1949 must be observed if the marriage is to be valid and parties who are less than 18 years of age must obtain consent under the Children Act 1989. The Civil Partnership Act 2004 introduced the concept of civil partnerships and the Marriage (Same Sex Couples) Act 2013 provides for same-sex marriage. The right to obtain a divorce is contained in the Matrimonial Causes Act 1973. The Gender Recognition Act 2004 allows transsexuals to change their legal gender.

The right to respect for family life, for which there is no general right at common law, is qualified by the broad principle that the welfare of the child is paramount and parental rights must take second place. In Gillick v West Norfolk Area Health Authority, Lord Scarman stated that "parental rights are derived from parental duty and exist only so long as they are needed for the protection of the person and property of the child", while Lord Fraser said that "parental rights to control a child do not exist for the benefit of the parent". The effect of this is to allow state intervention in family life where justified in the interests of the child in question, and the Children Act 1989 gives effect to this by providing a basis on which decisions relating to a child's welfare are made. Section 1 of the Act provides that a court must, when taking a decision with regard to a child, take into account the child's wishes and feelings. Adoption is regulated by the Adoption and Children Act 2002.

Local authorities have a duty to act in a way to facilitate the right to family life, for example in providing travel arrangements for the elderly under the Health Services and Public Health Act 1968. The right to education is guaranteed by the Education Act 1944, and the right to housing is enshrined in the Housing Act 1985. The enactment of the National Minimum Wage Act 1998 installed a minimum wage and the Social Security Contributions and Benefits Act 1992 provides access to social security benefits. There is no positive right to healthcare. The National Health Service Act 1977 imposes a duty on the Secretary of State to provide "adequate" healthcare but the courts have not thus far been willing to enforce this duty.

=== Torture and degrading treatment ===
The common law recognises that every person's body is "inviolate". Interference will constitute the offence of common assault and the tort of battery. Under the criminal law, an individual cannot consent to actual bodily harm and the House of Lords held in R v Brown that acts of sado-masochism committed in private between consenting adults did not give the author of the harm a valid defence in respect of his acts. The Children Act 2004 removed the defence of reasonable chastisement in respect of acts committed against children and corporal punishment in schools was outlawed in the Education Act 1996.

The Criminal Justice Act 1988 prohibits torture carried out by public officials in the performance of their duties and evidence obtained by torture is excluded by the common law. The Bill of Rights 1689 outlawed cruel and unusual punishment and provided that an action for damages could be brought by victims.

The Police and Criminal Evidence Act 1984 allows police to carry out "intimate searches" of suspects in custody without the person's consent.

=== Enjoyment of possessions ===
Protection against the arbitrary deprivation of property was recognised in the Magna Carta and is of key importance in the common law. Protection of the right to own and enjoy property is found in the offence of theft, by intellectual property laws and by the principle that there can be no taxation except that which is authorised by Parliament. The right to property is qualified by compulsory purchase laws.

In civil cases, a judge may grant an Anton Piller order authorising the search of premises and seizure of evidence without prior warning. The order's purpose is to prevent the destruction of incriminating evidence, particularly in cases of alleged intellectual property infringement.

=== Freedom from discrimination ===
The common law has not traditionally provided effective protection against discrimination, refusing to find that slavery in the colonies was contrary to public policy and not interpreting the word "person" to include women. Due to the inadequacies of the common law in this area, Parliament enacted the Race Relations Act 1965 and Race Relations Act 1968. The Sex Discrimination Act 1975 was the first legislation to protect against discrimination on the grounds of sex or marital status, while dismissal for pregnancy-related reasons is qualified as automatically unfair dismissal under the Employment Rights Act 1996. The principle of equal pay was brought in under the Equal Pay Act 1970.

Racial discrimination was prohibited by the Race Relations Act 1976 and disability discrimination by the Disability Discrimination Act 1995. Discrimination on the grounds of religion and belief in the workplace and tertiary education was first regulated by the Employment Equality (Religion or Belief) Regulations 2003. Sexual orientation discrimination in the workplace was prohibited by the Employment Equality (Sexual Orientation) Regulations 2003. Age discrimination in employment was prohibited by the Employment Equality (Age) Regulations 2006.

Much of this legislation was consolidated into the Equality Act 2010, the bulk of which entered into force in October 2010, which introduces an "equality duty" requiring public bodies to have due regard to the need to eliminate discrimination, to advance equality of opportunity and to foster good relations between people. It imposes a duty on public bodies to publish information about compliance with the equality duty and to set equality objectives. The Act clarifies existing legislation and simplifies the definition of direct discrimination, extends the definitions of indirect discrimination and harassment, regulates pay secrecy clauses in employment contracts and the use of health questionnaires by employers. It gives employment tribunals new powers to make recommendations to employers.

=== Electoral rights ===
The Representation of the People Acts 1983 and 2000 confer the franchise on British subjects and citizens of the Commonwealth and Ireland who are resident in the UK. Nationals of other Member States of the European Union have the right to vote in local elections and elections to the European Parliament. The right to vote includes the right to a secret ballot and the right to stand as a candidate in elections. Certain persons are excluded from participation including peers, aliens, infants, persons of unsound mind, holders of judicial office, civil servants, members of the regular armed forces or police, members of any non-Commonwealth legislature, members of various commissions, boards and tribunals, persons imprisoned for more than one year, bankrupts and persons convicted of corrupt or illegal election practices. The restriction on the participation of clergy was removed by the House of Commons (Removal of Clergy Disqualification) Act 2001.

The Political Parties, Elections and Referendums Act 2000 deals with the registration of political parties, while electoral boundaries are determined by four Boundary Committees established under the Parliamentary Constituencies Act 1986. Electoral campaigns and electoral publicity, including expenditure rules per candidate, are regulated by the Political Parties, Elections and Referendums Act 2000.

== European Union law ==
Fundamental rights form an integral part of European Union law. As such, the principle of primacy of European Union law requires that any action taken by its member states must comply with the requirements of EU law as to the protection of fundamental rights. In addition, the Charter of Fundamental Rights of the European Union, which has legal effect equivalent to the Treaties following the entry into force of the Treaty of Lisbon, is applicable to Member States when "they are implementing Union law". The Charter includes a number of rights not provided for in the Convention including the right of access to healthcare, the right of collective bargaining and action, the right to freedom of the arts and sciences, the right to education and the right of access to a free placement service.

The United Kingdom sought to obtain a partial opt-out from the application of the Charter with the addition of Protocol 30 which affirms that the European Court of Justice does not have the jurisdiction to state a breach of the Charter by national laws, regulations or administrative provisions, practices or action, and that nothing in Title IV of the Charter concerning employment rights creates "justiciable rights" applicable to the United Kingdom unless those rights exist already in its law. However, the Court of Justice held in December 2011 that Protocol 30 does not operate to exempt the United Kingdom from ensuring compliance with the Charter's provisions or from preventing a national court from doing so. The extent to which Member States are bound by the Charter was highlighted in a judgment of the European Court of Justice from February 2013 which held that compliance is required where national legislation falls within the scope of European Union law.

Other rights are conferred on UK nationals as citizens of the European Union, notably the right not to be discriminated against on grounds of nationality in an area within the scope of European Union law, the right to move and reside within the EU, the right to vote and stand for election in European and municipal elections, the right to diplomatic protection, the right to petition the European Parliament and the right to apply to the European Ombudsman. To these rights can be added the "four freedoms" of the European single market which include the right of free movement between Member States, the right to provide services in another Member State, the right to move capital between States and the right to move goods between States without restriction. The rights to equal pay and to equal treatment in the workplace and with regard to social security are also recognised.

== International law ==
The United Kingdom is party to a number of international treaties and agreements which guarantee fundamental human rights and freedoms. However, as the UK is a dualist state, treaties and agreements ratified by the government have only indirect effect until and unless incorporated into domestic law. The provisions of unincorporated treaties can have an impact on domestic law in a certain number of situations including the interpretation of legislation, the consideration of public policy and the assessment of the legality of the exercise of administrative discretion.

In particular, there is a presumption that Parliament does not intend to legislate in a manner contrary to international agreements which have been ratified by the United Kingdom but not incorporated into domestic law. This presumption is capable of rebuttal by reference to Hansard in accordance with the principle established in Pepper v Hart.

International human rights treaties and the UK
United Nations	Ratified	Incorporated	Council of Europe	Ratified	Incorporated
Convention on the Elimination of All Forms of Racial Discrimination	7 March 1969	No	European Convention on Human Rights	8 March 1951	Partially
International Covenant on Civil and Political Rights	20 May 1976	No	Protocol 1	3 November 1952	Yes
First Optional Protocol	No	No	Protocol 4	Signed 16 September 1963	No
Second Optional Protocol	10 December 1999	No	Protocol 6	20 May 1999	Yes
International Covenant on Economic, Social and Cultural Rights	20 May 1976	No	Protocol 7	No	No
Convention on the Elimination of All Forms of Discrimination Against Women	7 April 1986	No	Protocol 12	No	No
Optional Protocol	Acceded 17 December 2004	No	Protocol 13	10 October 2003	Yes
United Nations Convention Against Torture	8 December 1988	Partially	Protocol 14	28 January 2005	n/a
Optional Protocol	10 December 2003	No	Protocol 15	Signed 24 June 2013	n/a
Convention on the Rights of the Child	16 December 1991	No	European Social Charter	11 July 1962	No
Optional Protocol on the Involvement of Children in Armed Conflict	24 June 2003	No	Revised European Social Charter	Signed 7 November 1997	No
Optional Protocol on the sale of children, child prostitution and child pornography	20 February 2009	No	European Convention for the Prevention of Torture and Inhuman or Degrading Treatment or Punishment	24 June 1988	Partially
Convention on the Protection of the Rights of All Migrant Workers and Members of Their Families	No	n/a	European Charter for Regional or Minority Languages	27 March 2001	Partially
Convention on the Rights of Persons with Disabilities	8 June 2009	No	Framework Convention for the Protection of National Minorities	15 January 1998	Partially
Optional Protocol	7 August 2009	No	Convention on Action against Trafficking in Human Beings	17 December 2008	Partially

== Human rights violations and criticism ==
While protection of human rights is generally robust, the UK has under different governments a history of non-compliance with human rights, and has been criticised by the United Nations and other international bodies for discrimination, disregarding the rights of migrants, the unemployed, and the disabled.

=== Northern Ireland ===
During the 1970s and 1980s, the British government focused a lot of effort on measures to combat the activities of the Provisional Irish Republican Army (PIRA) and loyalist paramilitaries in Northern Ireland and Great Britain. In Northern Ireland, the government curtailed the civil liberties of all those, disproportionately from the Catholic nationalist minority (as the UK government commissioned Stevens Inquiries concluded; "This included examination and analysis of RUC records to determine whether both sides of the community were dealt with in equal measure. They were not."), who were interned without trial, and violated the human rights of some. During Operation Demetrius, for instance, a total of 1,981 people were interned without trial, of whom only 107 were loyalists, and no loyalists were arrested until 1973, 2 years after the introduction of internment.

The Ministry of Defence stated "moderate physical pressure" was applied to the men. The Republic of Ireland lodged a complaint against the British government for its alleged treatment of interned prisoners in Northern Ireland (ECHR Ireland v UK 1978). The European Court of Human Rights initially ruled that torture had been used, but on appeal amended the ruling to state that the techniques used, including sleep deprivation, hooding, stress postures, subjection to "white noise" and deprivation of food and drink, constituted "cruel and inhuman treatment", but fell short of torture, in a landmark 1978 case.

On 2 December 2014, in response to petitions from organisations including Amnesty International and the Pat Finucane Centre after RTÉ broadcast a documentary entitled The Torture Files – which included evidence that the UK government of the time had intentionally misled the European Courts by withholding information, and that the decision to use the five techniques had been taken at UK cabinet level – the Minister for Foreign Affairs and Trade, Charles Flanagan, announced that the Irish government had formally petitioned the EUCHR to re-examine the case. In 2018, the EUCHR decided the previous judgement was final. There have also been persistent allegations of collusion between loyalist paramilitaries and British security forces, such as in the 1989 murder of human rights lawyer Pat Finucane by members of the UVF, allegedly in collusion with MI5. In 2011, then UK Prime Minister David Cameron admitted that members of the UK security service were involved in the murder.

=== War on terror ===
Since 2001, the "war on terror" has led to new human rights concerns. The most recent criticism has concerned the now repealed Prevention of Terrorism Act 2005, a response to a perceived increased threat of terrorism. This act allowed the house arrest of terrorism suspects where there was insufficient evidence to bring them to trial, involving the derogation (opting-out) of human rights laws, through the imposition of control orders. This aspect of the Prevention of Terrorism Act was introduced because the detention without trial of nine foreigners at HM Prison Belmarsh under Part IV of the Anti-terrorism, Crime and Security Act 2001 was held to be unlawful under human rights legislation, by the House of Lords, in A and Others v. Secretary of State for the Home Department (2004).

Both the above Acts have been criticised for the lack of parliamentary discussion; the Anti-terrorism, Crime and Security Act 2001 went from introduction to Royal Assent in 32 days, the Prevention of Terrorism Act 2005 in 17.

The Civil Contingencies Act 2004 has also been criticised as giving the government very wide-ranging power in an emergency.

On 2 February 2005 Parliament's Joint Committee on Human Rights also suggested that the Identity Cards Act 2006 might contravene Article 8 of the European Convention (the right to respect for private life) and Article 14 (the right to non-discrimination).

In 2015, Home Secretary Theresa May introduced a Counter-Terrorism and Security Act, which was criticized by the civil liberties and human rights pressure group Liberty because 'Sadly this Bill ignores reforms that could improve the effectiveness of investigations and prosecutions and continues the discredited trend of unnecessary and unjust blank cheque powers that have the potential to undermine long term security'.

=== Internment ===
Following the 11 September 2001 attacks, the Anti-Terrorism, Crime and Security Act 2001 was passed. Part 4 of the Act provided for the indefinite detention without charge of foreign nationals certified by the Home Secretary as "suspected international terrorists" where such persons could not be deported on the grounds that they faced a real risk of torture, inhuman or degrading treatment if removed to their home country.

Part 4 did not create new detention powers – under the 1971 Immigration Act, the Home Secretary has the power to detain a foreign national pending deportation. Instead, Part 4 removed a limitation on detention powers imposed by the requirements of Article 5(1)(f) of the European Convention on Human Rights (which provided, among other things, that someone could only be detained for a short period prior to deportation). This was achieved by the British government derogating from the ECHR on the basis that the threat to the UK amounted to a 'public emergency threatening the life of the nation' within the meaning of Article 15.

However, the use of immigration detention powers meant that, although the British government could not force them, the detainees were technically free to return (albeit facing a real risk of torture). However, 2 detainees did leave – one to France and one to Morocco.

In 2002, the Special Immigration Appeals Commission held that indefinite detention under Part 4 was incompatible with the right to non-discrimination under Article 14 ECHR, on the basis that only suspected terrorists who were foreign nationals were subjected to detention, while suspects who were British nationals remained free. However, SIAC's declaration of Part 4's incompatibility with Article 14 was quashed by the Court of Appeal of England and Wales.

In December 2004, the House of Lords held 8-1 that Part 4 was incompatible with both Article 5 and Article 14 ECHR on the basis that indefinite detention was both a disproportionate measure notwithstanding the seriousness of the terrorist threat, as well as discriminatory.

Following the judgment, the government moved to introduce control orders as a (highly controversial) alternative measure. It was secured by the passing of the Prevention of Terrorism Act 2005, now repealed.

As per immigration policy documents from the Foreign Office, reviewed by The Guardian, the Downing Street sought advice on emulating the Australian offshore detention system model. Immigration policy experts warn that implementing the policy would create a fresh “human rights disaster”. Reportedly, dozens of people have died in the Australian detention network, while thousands of others have sustained mental trauma and self harm. The Australian government has been ordered in the past to pay a compensation of $70 million to about 2,000 detainees, following the case.

=== Human trafficking ===
There has been a growing awareness of human trafficking as a human rights issue in the UK, in particular the trafficking of women and under-age girls into the UK for forced prostitution. A particular high-profile case resulted in the conviction of five Albanians who 'trafficked' a 16-year-old Lithuanian girl and forced her into prostitution. According to Home Office figures, there are over 1,000 cases of trafficking each year. Under pressure from organisations such as Amnesty International, the UK government has recently signed the Council of Europe Convention on Action against Trafficking in Human Beings.

=== Disabled residents ===
In January 2014, the UK became the first country in its history to be investigated under the United Nations' Convention on the Rights of Persons with Disabilities for "systematic and grave violations" of disabled people's human rights, largely in response to cuts made by the Department for Work and Pensions and social care provision since 2011, which disproportionately affect disabled people, as well as workfare programmes and the "bedroom tax". The final report was published on 3 October 2017.

=== Child spies ===
In July 2018, a committee of the House of Lords revealed that British police and intelligence agencies are using children as spies in covert operations against terrorists, gangs and drug dealers. The committee raised alarm over government plans to give law enforcement bodies more freedom over their use of children. Some of the child spies are aged under 16. Parliament's joint committee on human rights has been asked to investigate the use of child spies by the police and security services. David Davis, the former Brexit secretary, Diane Abbott, the shadow home secretary, and a number of human rights groups have criticized the practice of using children as spies.

=== Domestic abuse ===
On 8 June 2020, Human Rights Watch (HRW) urged the UK Government to fill the loopholes in the "Domestic Abuse Bill", which does not include measures to protect all women and girls. The plea came following a rampant rise in domestic abuse during the COVID-19 pandemic.

=== Children's rights ===
According to a report by HRW and the Childhood Trust, the UK government was failing in its duty to ensure the right to adequate housing for homeless families. Thousands of homeless children in London are being placed in "uninhabitable" accommodations that violate their rights and cause "trauma".

=== 2022 Crime bill ===
The United Kingdom's Police, Crime, Sentencing and Courts Act 2022 is controversial, prior and after it was passed. It was welcomed by the Police Federation of England and Wales, while the Association of Police and Crime Commissioners (APCC), a group of elected officials in England and Wales, registered their disagreement with the bill. On the topic of proposed legally-binding restrictions on protests, the APCC chair Paddy Tipping stated: "I think politicians would be wise to leave decisions to the responsible people." Tipping added that "they've got to leave people to make local decisions in local circumstances." In March 2021, Michael Barton and Peter Fahy, the former chief constables of Durham Constabulary and Greater Manchester Police, respectively, said that the law threatened civil liberties and constituted a politically motivated move towards paramilitary policing. The advocacy group Liberty said the bill "threatens protest". Broadcaster and writer Kenan Malik warned the bill reduced the right to protest to "whispering in the corner". David Blunkett, the Labour Party home secretary from 2001 to 2004, called it an "anti-protest bill" threatening to make Britain look like Vladimir Putin's Russia.

The bill was based on the 2019 report by the conservative Policy Exchange think tank, which received in 2017 a $30,000 donation by oil and gas corporation ExxonMobil, to target Extinction Rebellion. After it was reported that other UK-based think tank have received donations by climate change deniers, Scottish National Party MP Alyn Smith commented this showed the UK's lobbying laws were not tough enough, saying: "He who pays the piper calls the tune. We urgently need to rewrite the laws governing this sort of sock puppet funding so that we can see who speaks for who." Green Party MP Caroline Lucas commented: "It appears that the Policing Bill is stained with the grubby, oil-soaked hands of the fossil fuel lobby. And no wonder – this cracks down on the fundamental rights of protestors to challenge the very climate-wrecking policies espoused by this downright dangerous industry." Priti Patel, who advocated for the policing bill, said it was intended to stop tactics used by Extinction Rebellion, which was mistakenly listed as an extremist group by the South East Counter Terrorism Unit, and continued to defend the decision after the guide was disawned in 2020. As of January 2022, despite initial "Kill the Bill" protests by grassroots groups, no mass movement opposing this bill has come together.

=== 2022 Nationality and Borders Act ===
The Nationality and Borders Act 2022 was proposed in July 2021 relating to immigration, asylum and the UK's modern slavery response. The Act also deals with British overseas territories citizenship and registration of stateless citizens. Amongst other elements, it proposes to introduce "designated places" or "offshore" asylum hubs for application of refugee and migrant asylum claims, potentially in another European country or an African country. Part 5 of the Act grants the Government new powers to limit who is considered a victim of modern slavery, with clauses limiting support in cases where survivors have not complied with State-set deadlines to disclose their abuse. Under Part 5, decision makers would also be asked to consider the survivors' criminal history before deeming them eligible for support.

In November 2021, an amendment to the Bill was introduced which, if passed, would allow people to be deprived of British citizenship without being given notice. At the time the Home Office stated its position on citizenship: "British citizenship is a privilege, not a right". As of 27 January 2022, it is in committee stage, with four sittings scheduled until 10 February 2022.

Under Clause 62, a 'public order' exemption will give the Government powers to ban survivors from support if they have a conviction of 12 months or more. Many non-violent crimes carry 12-month convictions, including activity routinely enforced by traffickers (such as marijuana cultivation or petty theft). The support exemption would also apply to children with custodial sentences.

Exemption from support, on the basis of offending, raised concerns due to the overlap between forced criminality and modern slavery. In the UK, a majority of reported survivors (49%) are forced to commit criminal activity as a result of their exploitation.

Under Clauses 60–61, guidance would be issued by the Secretary of State to prevent survivors from accessing a second recovery period, which charities such as the Anti Trafficking Labour Exploitation Unit warned could penalise particularly vulnerable victims who are targeted for repeat exploitation: "It is unclear what situation this clause is designed to address".

Under Clauses 57–58, the Secretary of State would be granted powers to issue potential victims with a 'deadline' by which point all evidence in their case must be shared with the relevant authority. Decision makers will be asked to consider compliance with the deadline as part of their decision as to whether or not somebody has been trafficked. The proposal has been condemned by civil society and the Independent Anti-Slavery Commissioner, Dame Sara Thornton, as disadvantaging those whose memory recall is affected by severe trauma. Survivor groups have outlined the role that Clauses 57-58 could play in disincentivising survivors from reporting.

Under Clause 59, the threshold that survivors must meet, in order to access the most urgent forms of support and subsistence, will be raised. Under the current system, survivors have access to support, such as a caseworker or translator, before being subjected to the toughest stage of decision making. In November 2021, more than 110 non-profit organisations condemned the 'tightening up' of support, in a letter to the Home Secretary led by the Human Trafficking Foundation.

In December 2021, the Scrap Part 5 campaign was launched by After Exploitation in conjunction with more than 40 non-profit organisations and law firms with specialism in human trafficking. The campaign appeals to Members of Parliament to share concerns with colleagues in the Lords, in order to see Part 5 removed from the Bill at Report stage. In February 2022, Lush cosmetics committed to promoting the Scrap Part 5 campaign in each of its UK shopfronts.

=== Online Safety Act 2023 ===
Numerous civil society and digital rights organisations have criticised the UK's Online Safety Act 2023, warning of its potential to undermine human rights and digital freedoms. The international human rights group Article 19 described the legislation as an "extremely complex and incoherent piece of legislation" and flagged it as a potential threat to human rights online. The Open Rights Group echoed this sentiment, branding the Online Safety Bill (OSB) as a "censor's charter". In an interview with the BBC, Rebecca MacKinnon of the Wikimedia Foundation criticised the Bill's provisions for introducing "harsh" criminal penalties for tech executives, warning that they would also impact public interest platforms such as Wikipedia. MacKinnon further argued that the Bill should have been modelled on the European Union's Digital Services Act, which differentiates between centralised and community-led content moderation.

The Wikimedia Foundation and Wikimedia UK expressed strong opposition to the OSB's age-verification requirements, declaring in April 2023 that Wikipedia would not implement these measures, as they conflicted with their principle of minimising user data collection. On 29 June 2023, both organisations issued an open letter calling on Parliament to exempt public interest platforms like Wikipedia before the Bill’s report stage commenced. In May 2025, the Foundation initiated a legal challenge against its possible classification as a "category one" service under the Act, describing the law as flawed but clarifying it was not opposing the legislation in full. During July court hearings, Wikimedia argued it could cap UK user numbers to avoid being designated as such. Government lawyers dismissed the issue as speculative and stated that inclusion would only occur if the platform met the legal thresholds.

Major tech firms have also raised concerns. Apple Inc. criticised the powers granted by the OSB that could compromise end-to-end encryption, calling the law "a serious threat" and urging lawmakers to revise the legislation. Meta Platforms objected to provisions that would allow access to private communications, with WhatsApp head Will Cathcart stating the service would rather be blocked in the UK than compromise its encryption. He also warned that message scanning would eliminate user privacy. Former cyber security chief Ciaran Martin argued that detecting child abuse content would inevitably weaken encryption, while Alan Woodward of the University of Surrey warned it would lead to "mass surveillance" through mission creep. A February 2024 ruling by the European Court of Human Rights supported this stance, declaring that degrading end-to-end encryption was incompatible with Article 6 of the European Convention on Human Rights and not justifiable in a democratic society.

== European Court of Human Rights cases ==
By the end of 2010, the European Court of Human Rights had, in 271 cases, found violations of the European Convention of Human Rights by the United Kingdom.[4]. These judgments cover a wide variety of areas, from the rights of prisoners to trade union activities. The decisions have also had a profound effect and influence on the approach adopted by the UK to the regulation of activities which could potentially engage Convention rights. As one author has noted, "[t]here is hardly an area of state regulation untouched by standards which have emerged from the application of Convention provisions to situations presented by individual applicants."

Notable cases involving violations of the Convention include:

- Criminal sanctions for private consensual homosexual conduct (Dudgeon, 1981);
- Refusal to legally recognise transsexuals (Rees, 1986);
- Different ages of consent for homosexuals and heterosexuals (Sutherland, 2000);
- Parents' rights to exempt their children from corporal punishment in schools (Campbell and Cosans, 1982);
- Sentencing a juvenile young offender to be "birched" (Tyrer, 1978);
- Wiretapping of suspects in the absence of any legal regulation (Malone, 1984);
- Restrictions on prisoners' correspondence and visits by their lawyers (Golder, 1975);
- Routine strip-searching of visitors to a prison (Wainwright, 2006);
- Allowing the Home Secretary rather than a court to fix the length of sentences (Easterbrook, 2003);
- Admitting testimony obtained under coercion as evidence (Saunders, 1996);
- Keeping a suspect incommunicado in oppressive conditions without access to a solicitor (Magee, 2000);
- Extradition of a suspect to the United States to face a capital charge (Soering, 1989);
- Granting the police blanket immunity from prosecution (Osman, 1998);
- Shooting of Provisional Irish Republican Army suspects in Gibraltar without any attempt to arrest them (McCann, 1995);
- Killing of a prisoner by another mentally ill detainee with whom he was sharing a cell (Edwards, 2002);
- Investigation of an unlawful killing by police officers conducted by the police officers who participated in the killing (McShane, 2002);
- Failure to protect a child from ill-treatment at the hands of his stepfather (A, 1998);
- Failure by a local authority to take sufficient measures in the case of severe neglect and abuse of children by their parents over several years (Z, 2001);
- Ineffective monitoring of a young prisoner who committed suicide during a short sentence (Keenan, 2001);
- Keeping a disabled person in dangerously cold conditions without access to a toilet (Price, 2001);
- Granting of an injunction against the Sunday Times for publishing an article on the effects of thalidomide (Sunday Times, 1979);
- Injunction against the Sunday Times for publishing extracts from the Spycatcher novel (Sunday Times (no. 2), 1991);
- Ordering a journalist to disclose his sources (Goodwin, 1996);
- Agreement obliging employees to join a certain trade union in order to keep their jobs (Young, 1981);
- Keeping a database of DNA samples taken from individuals arrested, but later acquitted or have the charges against them dropped (Marper, 2008);
- Forcing individuals to work for private companies without pay, under threat of having their social security payments stopped (Reilly, 2012, leading to the passing of the Jobseekers (Back to Work Schemes) Act 2013 as an ex post facto law, itself also criticised for violating human rights treaties).

== Human rights organisations ==
There are three national human rights institutions in the UK, each with specific jurisdiction and functions. All three are accredited with 'A' status by the International Co-ordinating Committee of NHRIs, and all participate in the European Group of NHRIs, in both cases sharing one (United Kingdom) vote.

- The first such body to be created was the Northern Ireland Human Rights Commission (NIHRC, www.nihrc.org) was set up in 1999, under the Northern Ireland Act 1998 which implemented elements of the Belfast (Good Friday) Agreement; its powers were strengthened by the Justice and Security (Northern Ireland) Act 2007. The Commission is mandated to promote and protect human rights in Northern Ireland through advising on legislation and policy, providing legal assistance to individuals, intervening in litigation, conducting litigation in its own name, publications, research, investigations, monitoring compliance with international standards, and education and training.
- The Equality and Human Rights Commission (EHRC, www.equalityhumanrights.com) deals with anti-discrimination and equality issues in England, Scotland and Wales, and with human rights issues in England and Wales, and certain human rights issues in Scotland (those not devolved to the Scottish Parliament).
- The Scottish Human Rights Commission (SHRC, www.scottishhumanrights.com) was established by The Scottish Commission for Human Rights Act 2006 (Scottish Parliament), and became fully operational on 10 December 2008, Human Rights Day, and the 60th Anniversary of the Universal Declaration of Human Rights. The Commission is mandated to promote and protect human rights in Scotland in relation to civil, political, economic, social and cultural rights, through publications, research, inquiries, advice, monitoring, legal intervention and education and training.

== See also ==
- Amnesty International, the largest human rights organisation in the world, was set up in the UK;
- ARTICLE 19 works to promote freedom of expression in the UK and worldwide;
- Civil liberties in the United Kingdom
- The Committee on the Administration of Justice is a human rights NGO in Northern Ireland.
- The Convention on Modern Liberty is a British voluntary body and programme of the Open Trust that aims to highlight what it sees as the erosion of civil liberties in the UK;
- The Islamic Human Rights Commission is a non-profit organisation based in London;
- JUSTICE is a human rights and law reform organisation based in the UK. It is the British Section of the International Commission of Jurists. Its mission is to promote human rights and advance the rule of law in the UK;
- Liberty is an influential pressure group which aims to protect civil liberties in the UK.
- Michael Mansfield
- Taking Liberties
