= Wilson v Secretary of State for Trade and Industry =

Wilson v SS for Trade and Industry
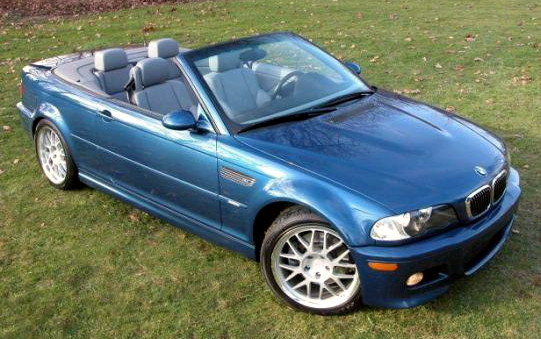
- Court: House of Lords
- Citations: [2003] UKHL 40, [2004] 1 AC 816

Case history
- Prior actions: [2001] EWCA Civ 633, [2002] QB 74

Court membership
- Judges sitting: Lord Nicholls, Lord Scott, Lord Rodger, Lord Hobhouse, Lord Hope

Keywords
- Contract law, ECHR, Right to property

Wilson v Secretary of State for Trade and Industry [2003] UKHL 40 is a United Kingdom human rights, consumer protection and contract law case. It made a decision on the applicability of Protocol 1, Article 1 of the ECHR and some important observations on the relevance of Hansard in litigation. It also raised a small point on unjust enrichment claims under the Consumer Credit Act 1974.

== Facts ==
Mrs Penelope Wilson pawned (or "pledged") her BMW 318 convertible for £5000 to a two-person company called First County Trust Ltd (i.e. she gave her car as security for a loan of £5000). She had to pay £304.50 per month in interest (a 94.78% pa interest rate). There was also a £250 "document fee", but because Mrs Wilson could not pay it, the fee was added to the loan. Six months later she had to redeem the car by paying the full amount of £7,327, or the car would be sold. She did not pay six months later. When the pawnbroker asked her for the money, instead of paying, she brought an action against him under the Consumer Credit Act 1974 to get her car back. Under s 127(3) an improperly executed consumer credit agreement - such as one where the debtor does not sign and the document does not contain all the prescribed terms of the agreement - is unenforceable by a creditor. Mrs Wilson argued that the £250 was not part of the credit under the agreement, and therefore where the document stated that £5250 was given as a loan, this was incorrect. Therefore, she argued the loan was unenforceable.

== Judgement ==
=== High Court ===
Judge Hull QC held that the fee of £250 was in fact part of the amount of the credit. So the agreement was enforceable. However, he also held that the agreement was an "extortionate credit bargain" and used his power under the 1974 Act to reduce the amount of interest by one half. Mrs Wilson appealed.

=== Court of Appeal ===
The Court of Appeal (Sir Andrew Morritt VC, Rix LJ and Chadwick LJ [2001] QB 407) held that the £250 was not credit, and therefore because the document had misstated the terms contrary to the 1974 Act, the agreement was unenforceable. However they went on in another judgment ([2001] EWCA Civ 633) to hold that because the 1974 Act made consumer agreements wholly unenforceable, it was both contrary to the right to a fair trial (Article 6 ECHR) and the right to peaceful enjoyment of one's possessions (Prot 1, Art 1 ECHR). Because the 1974 Act rendered the agreement unenforceable, the Court of Appeal held that the right to a fair trial was breached, and because no money could be recovered for the loan with an unenforceable agreement, the 1974 Act interfered with the right to possessions disproportionately.

They therefore issued a declaration of incompatibility under the Human Rights Act 1998 s 4.

=== House of Lords ===
Lord Nicholls (with whom Lords Hobhouse, Hope, Rodger and Scott delivered concurred) held that the Consumer Credit Act 1974 s 127(3) was not incompatible with the European Convention on Human Rights. On article 6 ECHR he emphasised that the right to a fair trial is a procedural right, not a substantive right, and that because the pawnbrokers were not denied access to court, but only precluded in their substantive right of having a binding agreement, art 6 was not engaged. On prot 1, art 1 ECHR, he held that the right was not violated, because s 127(3) was intended by Parliament to make any unfair contract unenforceable, so that one might not even get the amount back (possibly even in a mildly penal approach). At 71 he remarked,

Something more drastic was needed in order to focus attention on the need for lenders to comply strictly with these particular obligations.

Even though in individual cases there may be bad outcomes, the policy "overall ... may well be a proportionate response" [74]. There was a "perennial social problem" [79]. He did add, if the limit, then of £5,000, set out in s 8(2), did not exist he might have decided differently different. Therefore, with the then limit, the 1974 Act was a proportionate balancing of the rights of consumers against pawnbrokers. S 8(2) was repealed by the Consumer Credit Act 2006.
