= Declaration of incompatibility =

Form of constitutional declaration by UK court of law

A declaration of incompatibility in UK constitutional law is a declaration issued by a United Kingdom judge that a statute is incompatible with the European Convention on Human Rights under the Human Rights Act 1998 section 4. This is a central part of UK constitutional law. Very few declarations of incompatibility have been issued, in comparison to the number of challenges.

== Human rights in the United Kingdom ==
Section 3(1) of the Human Rights Act 1998 reads as follows: "So far as it is possible to do so, primary legislation and subordinate legislation must be read and given effect in a way which is compatible with the Convention rights". Where the court determines a piece of legislation is inconsistent with the Convention rights, the court can issue a declaration of incompatibility under section 4 of the Human Rights Act 1998. However, the declaration of incompatibility is often seen as a last resort as the judiciary will attempt to interpret primary legislation as being compatible. Such a declaration will only be issued if such a reading is not possible.

Once the court has issued a declaration of incompatibility, the law remains the same until Parliament removes the incompatibility. The courts must still apply the legislation as it is and the parties to the actual case are unaffected by the declaration. Hence, the declaration has no actual legal effect and the parties neither gain nor lose by it. A declaration of incompatibility is only the start of a remedy to a Human Rights Act 1998 claim. Section 8 of the Act enables the court to make any further remedy it sees fit.

In England and Wales, the High Court, Court of Appeal, Supreme Court, Judicial Committee of the Privy Council, and the Courts Martial Appeal Court can issue declarations of incompatibility. In Scotland, in addition to the Supreme Court, the Court of Session and the High Court of Justiciary are also able to issue declarations of incompatibility. In Northern Ireland, the Northern Irish High Court or Court of Appeal can issue a statement of incompatibility for Acts of the Northern Irish Assembly.

By section 10 of the Human Rights Act 1998, a "fast track" option of a remedial order (a type of statutory instrument) can be used by a government minister to amend non-compliant legislation which has been declared incompatible (except if it is a measure of the Church of England). The order must be approved by both houses of Parliament before being made, unless the minister deems the matter to be urgent. As of 2016 this option has been used twice: in 2001 for the Mental Health Act 1983, and in 2009 for the Sexual Offences Act 2003.

== List of cases ==
As of the end of July 2025, there had been 63 declarations of incompatibility. Of these, 13 had been overturned on appeal.

	Case	Citation	Description	Result
1.	R (H) v Secretary of State for Health	[2001] EWCA Civ 415	Sections 72 and 73 of the Mental Health Act 1983 ss 72–73, where a Mental Health Review Tribunal was not required to discharge a patient after it was shown there was no disorder to warrant detention, was found incompatible with ECHR art 5.	HRA 1998 s 10 remedial order made: Mental Health Act 1983 (Remedial) Order 2001 (SI 2001 No.3712).
2.	McR's Application for Judicial Review	[2003] NI 1	The Offences Against the Person Act 1861 s 62, creating an offence for attempted buggery in Northern Ireland, was incompatible with ECHR art 8.	Offences repealed by Sexual Offences Act 2003, sections 139, 140, Sch 6 para 4 and Sch 7.
3.	International Transport Roth GmbH v Secretary of State for the Home Department	[2002] EWCA Civ 158	The Immigration and Asylum Act 1999 Part II violated ECHR art 6 by fixing penalties, rather than letting a penalty be determined by an independent tribunal. It also violated Article 1 of Protocol 1 as it imposed an excessive burden on the carriers.	Amended by Nationality, Immigration and Asylum Act 2002, section 125 and Schedule 8.
4.	R (Anderson) v Secretary of State for the Home Department	[2002] UKHL 46	The Crime (Sentences) Act 1997 s 29, which empowered the Secretary of State to set minimum terms of imprisonment for life sentences, violated ECHR art 6, which requires a sentence to be imposed by an independent and impartial tribunal.	Repealed by Criminal Justice Act 2003, sections 303(b)(I), 332 and Schedule 37, Pt 8.
5.	R (D) v Secretary of State for the Home Department	[2002] EWHC 2805	The Mental Health Act 1983 s 74 violated ECHR art 5(4) by making continued detention of discretionary life prisoners depend upon discretion of the executive to have access to a court.	Amended by Criminal Justice Act 2003 section 295.
6.	Blood and Tarbuck v Secretary of State for Health	Unreported	The Human Fertilisation and Embryology Act 1990 s 28(6)(b) violated ECHR art 8 and 14 for not allowing a deceased father's name to be given on the birth certificate of his child.	Amended by Human Fertilisation and Embryology (Deceased Fathers) Act 2003.
7.	Bellinger v Bellinger	[2003] UKHL 21	The Matrimonial Causes Act 1973 s 11(c) was incompatible with Articles 8 and 12 in so far as it makes no provision for the recognition of gender reassignment.	Amended by Gender Recognition Act 2004.
8.	R (M) v Secretary of State for Health	[2003] EWHC 1094	The Mental Health Act 1983 ss 26 and 29 were incompatible with Article 8, as the claimant had no choice over the appointment or legal means of challenging the appointment of her nearest relative.	Amended by Mental Health Act 2007 ss 23–26
9.	R (Wilkinson) v IRC	[2003] EWCA Civ 814	The Taxes Act 1988 was incompatible with Article 14 when read with Article 1 of Protocol 1 for discriminating against widowers in the provision of Widows Bereavement Allowance.	Already repealed by the time of the case by Finance Act 1999 sections 34(1), 139, Schedule 20.
10.	R (Hooper) v Secretary of State for Work and Pensions	[2003] EWCA Civ 875	The Social Security Contributions and Benefits Act 1992 ss 36–37 violated ECHR art 14 and art 8, and article 1, Protocol 1 for providing benefits to widows but not widowers.	Already amended by Welfare Reform and Pensions Act 1999 s 54(1).
11.	A v Secretary of State for the Home Department	[2004] UKHL 56	The Anti-terrorism, Crime and Security Act 2001 s 23 was incompatible with Articles 5 and 14. It was held to be disproportionate by permitting the detention of suspected international terrorists in a way that discriminated on the ground of nationality or immigration status. The Human Rights Act 1998 (Designated derogation) Order 2001 was a disproportionate means to achieve protection from terrorism.	Prevention of Terrorism Act 2005 changed the regime to control orders.
12.	R (Sylviane Pierrette Morris) v Westminster City Council	[2005] EWCA Civ 1184	Housing Act 1996 s 185(4) violated Article 14 to the extent that it requires a dependent child under immigration control to be disregarded when determining whether a British citizen has priority need for accommodation.	Amended by Housing and Regeneration Act 2008 Sch 15.
13.	R (Gabaj) v First Secretary of State	[2006] Unreported	Section 185(4) of the Housing Act 1996 is incompatible with ECHR art 14 in that prioritising need of households for housing disregards a pregnant woman from abroad who is ineligible for housing assistance.	Amended by Housing and Regeneration Act 2008 Sch 15.
14.	R (Baiai) v SS Home Dept	[2008] UKHL 53	The Asylum and Immigration (Treatment of Claimants etc) Act 2004 19(3) is incompatible with ECHR arts 12 and 14, in that dealing with sham marriages infringes on the right to marry.	Asylum and Immigration (Treatment of Claimants, etc) Act 2004 (Remedial Order) 2011
15.	R (Wright) v Secretary of State for Health	[2009] UKHL 3	Procedures under the Care Standards Act 2000 Part VII found incompatible with arts 6 and 8, in that a provisional listing immediately damaged the care worker's career prospects without any hearing or opportunity to make representations.	Court of Appeal itself reinterpreted the Act to require an opportunity to make representations unless it would lead to unacceptable delay.
16.	R (Clift) v Secretary of State for the Home Department	[2006] UKHL 54	The Parole Board (Transfer of Functions) Order 1998 provisions on early release discriminates against prisoners on long sentences compared to both those on shorter and on life sentences, in breach of ECHR art 14 in conjunction with art 5.	
17.	Smith v Scott	[2007] CSIH 9	A blanket ban on prisoners voting breaches Art 3 of the First Protocol to the ECHR.	
18.	R (F and Thompson) v Secretary of State for Justice	[2008] EWHC 3170 (Admin)	Sex offenders' indefinite placement on a register and obligations thereby to report movements etc to police are disproportionate and in breach of ECHR art 8.	
19.	R (Royal College of Nursing) v SSHD	[2010] EWHC 2761	The previous scheme established under the Safeguarding Vulnerable Groups Act 2006 which automatically prohibited those placed on lists established under the scheme from working with children and/or vulnerable adults was unlawful: the absence of a right to make representations breached their right to a fair trial.	
20.	R (T) v Chief Constable of Greater Manchester	[2013] EWCA Civ 25	The Rehabilitation of Offenders Act 1974 and Police Act 1997 issue of Criminal Record Certificates required for working with children or vulnerable adults. Disclosure of spent cautions and minor convictions (e.g. a caution age 11 for stealing two bicycles) breached the right to private life under ECHR Art 8.	
21.	R (Reilly (no 2) v Secretary of State for Work and Pensions	[2016] EWCA Civ 413	Jobseekers (Back to Work Schemes) Act 2013 was incompatible with their rights under ECHR Article 6 (right to a fair trial) and Article 1 of the First Protocol (protection of property).	
22.	Benkharbouche v Embassy of the Republic of Sudan, and Libya	[2015] EWCA Civ 33		
23.	David Miranda v Secretary of State for the Home Department	[2016] EWCA Civ 6	Terrorism Act 2000 Sch 7, stopping and questioning	
24.	R (P and A) v Secretary of State for the Home Department	[2016] EWHC 89 (Admin)	Disclosure of previous convictions to be used as evidence in trial was held to be incompatible with Article 8, since they infringe upon the respondent's private life.	
25.	R (G) v Constable of Surrey Police	[2016] EWHC 295 (Admin)	A statutory scheme for the disclosure of spent criminal records was incompatible with Article 8.	
26.	Z (A Child) (No 2)	[2016] EWHC 1191	Human Fertilisation and Embryology Act 2008 s 54	The Human Fertilisation and Embryology Act 2008 (Remedial) Order 2018
27.	R (Johnson) v Secretary of State for the Home Department	[2016] UKSC 56		
28.	Consent Order in R (Bangs) v Secretary of State for the Home Department	2017, unreported		
29.	Smith v Secretary of State for Justice	[2017] EWCA Civ 1916		
30.	R (Steinfeld and Keidan) v Secretary of State for the International Development	[2018] UKSC 32	Sections 1 and 3 of the Civil Partnership Act 2004 (to the extent that they preclude a different sex couple from entering into a civil partnership) are incompatible with ECHR article 14 taken in conjunction with article 8.	Legislation amended by Civil Partnerships, Marriages and Deaths (Registration etc) Act 2019
31.	K (A Child) v Secretary of State for the Home Department	[2018] EWHC 1834		
32.	Siobhan McLaughlin, Re Judicial Review (Northern Ireland)	[2018] UKSC 48		
33.	Jackson and Simpson v Secretary of State for Work and Pensions	[2020] EWHC 183 (Admin)		
34.	In the matter of application by 'JR111' for judicial review (ruling on remedy)	[2021] NIQB 48		
35.	Secretary of State for Business and Trade (Respondent) v Mercer (Appellant)	[2024] UKSC 12	Section 146 of TULRCA 1992 was incompatible with ECHR Article 11 with no legal protection for workers participating in industrial action against detriments short of dismissal.	Amended by Employment Rights Act 2025

The following cases involved declarations of incompatibility that were overturned on appeal:

	Case	Citation	Description	Result
1.	R (Alconbury Developments Ltd) v Secretary of State for the Environment, Transport and the Regions	[2001] UKHL 23	Town and Country Planning Act 1990 ss 77–79	
2.	Wilson v First County Trust Ltd (No.2)	[2003] UKHL 40	Consumer Credit Act 1974 s 127(3)	
3.	Matthews v Ministry of Defence	[2003] UKHL 4	Crown Proceedings Act 1947 s 10	
4.	R (Uttley) v Secretary of State for the Home Department	[2004] UKHL 38		
5.	R (MH) v Secretary of State for Health	[2005] UKHL 60		
6.	Re MB	[2007] UKHL 46		
7.	Nasseri v Secretary of State for the Home Department	[2009] UKHL 23		
8.	R (Black) v Secretary of State for Justice	[2009] UKHL 1		
9.	Northern Ireland Human Rights Commission’s Application	[2015] NIQB 102	The Offences against the Person Act 1861 ss 57–58, and the Criminal Justice Act (NI) 1945 s 25, banning abortion in Northern Ireland, were incompatible with ECHR arts 3, 8 and 14.	Reversed by Northern Ireland Court of Appeal
10.	R (Joint Council of Immigrants) v Secretary of State for the Home Department	[2019] EWHC 452	The right to rent scheme is incompatible with article 14 of ECHR taken in conjunction with article 8 and 14 of the convention. Any rollout of the scheme to Scotland, Wales or Northern Ireland without further evaluation would be a breach of s 149 of the Equality Act 2010.	
11.	In the matter of an application by JR123 for judicial review	[2025] UKSC 8		Overturned by the UK Supreme Court
12.	Morgan and others (Respondents) v Ministry of Justice (Appellant) (Northern Ireland)	[2023] UKSC 14		Overturned by UK Supreme Court

As of March 2025, there are no cases pending appeal.

The following cases involved the court finding that a statute was incompatible but not making a formal declaration of incompatibility:

	Case	Citation	Description	Result
1.	R (on the application of Chester) v Secretary of State for Justice	[2013] UKSC 63	European Parliamentary Elections Act 2002 s8	The Supreme Court held that a blanket prohibition on convicted prisoners voting in European Parliament elections was incompatible with Protocol 1 article 3 of the convention, but the Supreme Court declined to make a declaration of incompatibility as the same issue had been raised (in relation to local, Scottish Parliament and UK Parliament elections) in Smith v Scott [2007] CSIH 9, where the incompatibility of section 3 of the Representation of the People Act 1983 had been declared, and the issue was already being considered by the UK Parliament. A declaration was a discretionary remedy, and there was no point in making any further declaration of incompatibility.
2.	In the matter of an application by the Northern Ireland Human Rights Commission for Judicial Review (Northern Ireland)	[2018] UKSC 27	Offences Against the Person Act 1861 ss 58–59	The Supreme Court held that the provisions were incompatible with the right to respect for private and family life, guaranteed by article 8 of the convention, insofar as they prohibited abortion in cases of rape, incest and fatal foetal abnormality. However, the court also held that the claimant did not have standing to bring the proceedings and accordingly the court had no jurisdiction to make a declaration of incompatibility to reflect its view on the compatibility issues.

== See also ==
- Sections 4 and 10 of the Human Rights Act 1998
