= Section 3 of the Human Rights Act 1998 =

Provision of the Human Rights Act 1998

Section 3 of the Human Rights Act 1998 is a provision of the United Kingdom's Human Rights Act 1998 that requires courts to interpret both primary and subordinate legislation so that their provisions are compatible with the articles of the European Convention of Human Rights, which are also part of the Human Rights Act 1998. This interpretation goes far beyond normal statutory interpretation, and includes past and future legislation, therefore preventing the Human Rights Act from being impliedly repealed by subsequent contradictory legislation.

The provision reads:

3 Interpretation of legislation.

(1) So far as it is possible to do so, primary legislation and subordinate legislation must be read and given effect in a way which is compatible with the Convention rights.
(2) This section—

(a) applies to primary legislation and subordinate legislation whenever enacted;
(b) does not affect the validity, continuing operation or enforcement of any incompatible primary legislation; and
(c) does not affect the validity, continuing operation or enforcement of any incompatible subordinate legislation if (disregarding any possibility of revocation) primary legislation prevents removal of the incompatibility.

Courts have applied section 3 of the Act through three forms of interpretation: "reading in" – inserting words where there are none in a statute; "reading out" where words are omitted from a statute; and "reading down" where a particular meaning is chosen to be in compliance. They do not interpret statutes to conflict with legislative intent, and courts have been reluctant in particular to "read out" provisions for this reason. If it is not possible to so interpret, they may issue a declaration of incompatibility under section 4.

Section 3 does not apply to the Illegal Migration Act 2023.

== Context ==
Human rights are rights taken to be universal, of considerable importance, and relate to the individual and not collectively; among other things, they can grant freedoms, claims, immunities and powers. The European Convention on Human Rights was drawn up in the wake of the Second World War to uphold such rights. The United Kingdom ratified the European Convention on Human Rights in 1951, and accepted the right of individual petition to the European Court of Human Rights, Strasbourg, in 1966. The Human Rights Act 1998 made most Convention rights directly enforceable in a British court for the first time. Excluded are Articles 1 and 13, which the government argued were fulfilled by the Act itself, and therefore were not relevant to rights enforced under it. The Human Rights Act has had a considerable effect on British law, and remains an Act of "fundamental constitutional importance".

== Provisions ==
Diagram showing the interaction of sections 3, 4 and 10 of the Human Rights Act 1998

Section 3(1) states that "So far as it is possible to do so, primary legislation and subordinate legislation must be read and given effect in a way which is compatible with the Convention rights." Accordingly, a court must read any statute passed by parliament so as to uphold Convention rights, where this is possible. It is possibly the section of the act with the widest scope. The Human Rights Act therefore built upon a small number of previously recognised absolute freedoms which could only be expressly subjugated to another aim. This is different from other systems, such as the New Zealand Bill of Rights, that require an interpretation to be "reasonable". As happened in R (Anderson) v Home Secretary, the alternative where such interpretation is not possible the alternative is a declaration of incompatibility under Section 4. Lord Hoffmann in a case, R (Simms) v Home Secretary, which bridged the introduction of the Human Rights Act, said:

Parliamentary sovereignty means that Parliament can, if it chooses, legislate contrary to fundamental principles of human rights. The Human Rights Act 1998 will not detract from this power. The constraints upon its exercise by Parliament are ultimately political, not legal. But the principle of legality means that Parliament must squarely confront what it is doing and accept the political cost. Fundamental rights cannot be overridden by general or ambiguous words. This is because there is too great a risk that the full implications of their unqualified meaning may have passed unnoticed in the democratic process. In the absence of express language or necessary implication to the contrary, the courts therefore presume that even the most general words were intended to be subject to the basic rights of the individual. In this way the courts of the United Kingdom, though acknowledging the sovereignty of Parliament, apply principles of constitutionality little different from those which exist in countries where the power of the legislature is expressly limited by a constitutional document.

"Read and give effect" requires the interpretation "where possible" of legislation – where there is an interpretation open to the court that is consistent with Convention rights, it must be chosen over those that do not. Following the introduction of the Human Rights Act, there was some disagreement between judges as to how far this provision went. Lord Steyn, in R v A, has said "the interpretative obligation under section 3 of the 1998 Act is a strong one. It applies even if there is no ambiguity in the language in the sense of the language being capable of two different meanings." He further noted that it may be necessary under section 3 to "adopt an interpretation which linguistically may appear strained" and that a declaration of incomparability was a "measure of last resort". However, In re S established that there may be cases where interpretation can go too far; that the court can assume an administrative power it would not ordinarily have, with practical consequences that it is not best placed to consider: "a meaning which departs substantially from a fundamental feature of an Act of Parliament is likely to have crossed the boundary between interpretation and amendment." Given that the precise wording of a statute could be altered under the section, the "thrust" was important; going against the "thrust" required legislative power that the courts did not have. Although other sources could be used (see, for example, Pepper v Hart), the wording of a statute must be considered the primary intent of parliament. The decision in Ghaidan v Godin-Mendoza appears to have achieved some settling of the approach taken in extreme cases.

Section 3(2)(a) extends the scope of section 3 to past and future Acts of Parliament in addition to present legislation. It therefore contradicts the usual policy of implied repeal – whereby any inconsistency between statutes are resolved in favour of the later statute. The Human Rights Act must therefore be explicitly (or "expressly") repealed by an Act of Parliament deliberately doing so, not merely be introducing contradictory legislation. The act therefore carries an additional normative force and has been considered constitutional in character as a result. It is widely recognised that parliament may never directly contradict convention rights, or at least do so very rarely. Sections 3(2)(b) and 3(2)(c) confirm the validity of all legislation, whether or not it has been interpreted under Section 3. Section 3 can therefore be said to protect primary legislation which is incompatible, and any secondary legislation made under such primary legislation.

== Interpretation ==
Three types of judicial interpretation are commonly identified in the context of section 3: "reading in", "reading out" and "reading down". "Reading in" refers to adding in words that are not present in the statute so as to ensure compliance with Convention rights, and "reading out" removing words in a statute to do so. These processes had already been implemented with reference to the implementation of European legislation, so as to ensure compliance of domestic law with European law. Although accepted with secondary legislation, they remain controversial with primary legislation, since parliament would have included or omitted such words if it had had such an intent; reading in or out words would therefore conflict with parliamentary intention. Courts have, however, accepted these powers, and during the passing of the Human Rights Act, it was agreed that the courts would have such a power.

In R v A, extra provisions were read into a statute to ensure compliance, since the statute itself had the legitimate aim of protecting potential rape victims; it was merely, in the words of Lord Steyn, that "the methods adopted amounted to legislative overkill". In Poplar Housing v Donaghue, the Court of Appeal rejected the possibility of reading in a provision, because it would have altered the method of remedying the problem to that laid down by Parliament, amounting to starting afresh on how best to approach the issue. Courts have been far more reluctant to read out wording for fear of going against parliamentary intention, but it remains a possibility.

"Reading down" involves choosing an interpretation that is compatible, where more than one is strictly possible. For example, placing a persuasive burden of proof on a defendant raising a defence – that he need persuade the jury that it is the case, was judged to be incompatible with Article 6(2) of the convention, which related to the presumption of innocence, which had long been a part of English law in R v Lambert. The court read down the burden of proof as merely one of an evidential burden – meaning the defendant merely had to raise some evidence to support the defence, which it believed did not conflict with Article 6(2). However, in Sheldrake v DPP, the court instead requiring a persuasive burden, because it believed in the context of the motoring offence in the case, this was not disproportionate and did not conflict with Article 6(2).

== Controversy ==
The relationship between sections 3 and 4 and parliamentary sovereignty has been commented on most extensively. The most common criticism has been of the implied limitations on legislative supremacy. Opponents of this criticism has questioned both its factual accuracy and its suggestion that the weakening of parliamentary sovereignty should be avoided. They instead cite morality and constitutionalism as among positive features of this change. The limits of courts' powers have also been queried. The retroactivity of law making is one criticism related to the rule of law, although the advancement of human rights is seen as a positive feature also associated with the rule of law. Whilst the scope of section 3 has been criticised for being vague and there have been warnings about the imposition of the judiciary on parliament's domain, these have also been challenged.

== Academic commentary ==
Before the Human Rights Act was brought before parliament, the government's white paper considered that it was necessary to prevent courts from setting aside legislation on the basis of incompatibility (reflecting a strong need to respect parliamentary sovereignty). However, the effect on parliamentary sovereignty has been criticised despite the safeguards put in place. Section 3 has been defended, however, by reference to the enhanced morality and constitutionalism of the new system, prompted by an "incoming tide" of human rights. Aileen Kavanagh considers the choice of a court in cases not a question of parliamentary sovereignty, but a complex question of how far the judiciary can perform a legislative function in that area. She considers the political and legislative pressure on government after section 3 or 4 overwhelming to the extent that the concept of parliamentary sovereignty should be "eliminated". However, other writers have stressed the importance of the formal right to ignore either decision. The result of this debate has been to label section 3 either a "radical tool" to implement human rights, or a "significant limitation" of Parliament's will.

Geoffrey Marshall has characterised section 3 as a "deeply mysterious provision" in several respects, including judging how strong a provision it is – an issue since dealt with by the courts – but has also noted a disparity between what the Act might be expected to do and what it does. He argues that a litigant would hope that courts would strive to uphold his rights under the convention, accepting a derivation from them only rarely; instead section 3 requires courts to find compatibility with the Convention where possible – in other words, to strive to find that the Convention does not impact the claimant. Alison L. Young has examined the upper boundaries to courts' powers of interpretation. She puts forward three possible limits: firstly, where the text of a statute is not ambiguous; secondly, where reading in words is inappropriate; and, thirdly, where any interpretation is restricted to cases where it does not involve implied repeal. Young dismisses the first two as incompatible with the legislative history (and, in at least the first case, judicial history) and believes the third to present no rigid limit on courts' powers at all. The decision of Pepper v Hart provides a method for the legislative history of a bill to play a role in its interpretation.

Philip Sales and Richard Ekins are among those that believe that section 3 has not displaced the purpose of interpretation – to discern parliamentary intention. In their eyes, section 3 is about "how interpreters are to infer that intention". They also criticise the "judicial lawmaking" because it applies to the case in hand, concluding that this breaks the non-retroactivity commonly considered part of the rule of law, although it is sometimes necessary. They also note that rules made by courts are not transparent, because their new interpretation under section 3 differs from their ordinary meaning – after all, section 3 must go beyond standard interpretation. This leaves citizens uncertain of what the law is. Sales and Ekins also suggest that while applying section 3 to post-Human Rights Act legislation might be merely using a presumption that the legislature intended to follow it, applying it to pre-Human Rights Act legislation cannot possibly base itself on such an inference. Section 3, though, still allows them to do so.

Another view is that Section 3 provides a much strengthened basis for the sort of "weak review" – the scope of which carefully determined between courts on one hand and parliament on the other – in a statutory form. There have been at least three criticisms put forward: firstly that the impossibility of implied repeal goes against some formulations of parliamentary sovereignty that require that no parliament can bind a future parliament. Secondly, whether section 3 interpretations follow parliamentary intent is questionable; thirdly, if it does allow interpretations contrary to intent, section 3 may render section 4 necessary. However, judicial powers are probably not unconstrained. The analysis of what the courts can and cannot do would also provide the answer the third criticism, depending on the viewpoint. Whilst the scope of section 3 has been criticised for being vague, and leading therefore more easily to the imposition of the judiciary on the legal domain of parliament, this viewpoint is controversial: they do not seem to have yet so encroached and there are rules emerging about the application of section 3.
