= Sections 4 and 10 of the Human Rights Act 1998 =

Provision of the Human Rights Act 1998

Sections 4 and 10 of the Human Rights Act 1998 are provisions that enable the Human Rights Act 1998 to take effect in the United Kingdom. Section 4 allows courts to issue a declaration of incompatibility where it is impossible to use section 3 to interpret primary or subordinate legislation so that their provisions are compatible with the articles of the European Convention of Human Rights, which are also part of the Human Rights Act. In these cases, interpretation to comply may conflict with legislative intent. It is considered a measure of last resort. A range of superior courts can issue a declaration of incompatibility.

A declaration of incompatibility is not binding on the parties to the proceedings in which it is made, nor can a declaration invalidate legislation. Section 4 therefore achieves its aim through political rather than legal means, including through Section 10 which allows the government to amend legislation without full legislative approval. A remedial order can only be made after a declaration of incompatibility or a similar finding of a European court with all appeals must have been complete or expressly renounced. Parliament has used Section 10 to make small adjustments where possible to bring legislation into line with Convention rights although entirely new pieces of legislation are sometimes necessary.

== Context ==
Human rights are rights taken to be universal, of considerable importance, and relate to the individual and not collectively; among other things, they can grant freedoms, claims, immunities and powers. The European Convention on Human Rights was drawn up in the wake of the Second World War to uphold such rights. The United Kingdom ratified the European Convention on Human Rights in 1951, and accepted the right of individual petition to the European Court of Human Rights, Strasbourg, in 1966. The Human Rights Act 1998 made most Convention rights directly enforceable in a British court for the first time. Excluded are Articles 1 and 13, which the government argued were fulfilled by the Act itself, and therefore were not relevant to rights enforced under it. The Human Rights Act has had a considerable effect on British law, and remains an Act of "fundamental constitutional importance".

== Provisions ==
Section 4 allows a court to make a "declaration of incompatibility" if it is "satisfied that the provision is incompatible with a Convention right". Section 3 requires that courts interpret legislation as compatible with Convention rights wherever possible. Lord Steyn has described a declaration of incompatibility was a "measure of last resort". However, In re S (Minors) (Care Order: Implementation of Care Plan) [2002] established that there may be cases where interpretation can go too far; that the court can assume an administrative power it would not ordinarily have, with practical consequences that it is not best placed to consider: "a meaning which departs substantially from a fundamental feature of an Act of Parliament is likely to have crossed the boundary between interpretation and amendment." The "thrust" of a statute is important; going against the "thrust" requires legislative power that the courts do not have. As in R (Anderson) v Home Secretary, a declaration of incompatibility under section 4 of the Act may be the only appropriate remedy.

The United Kingdom recognises parliamentary sovereignty. The legislature is above the courts, and the courts cannot therefore declare legislation invalid. Section 4 reflects this, and states that courts must continue to apply legislation, even if incompatible with Convention rights. Section 4(6)(a) notes that a declaration of incompatibility "does not affect the validity, continuing operation or enforcement of the provision in respect of which it is given", which is similar to Section 3(2)(b). R v Lyons confirmed that evidence could be used, even where incompatible with Convention rights, if it was expressly allowed under statute. A declaration of incompatibility is merely a flag that alerts Parliament that people's human rights are being infringed. Accordingly, it has no more legal effect than the fact of incompatible.

Section 4(4) allows the court to issue a declaration of incompatibility if altering secondary legislation is impossible because it would necessarily conflict with a statute. Following amendment by the Constitutional Reform Act 2005, the Armed Forces Act 2006 and the Mental Capacity Act 2005, courts which are entitled to issue a declaration of incompatibility are the Supreme Court, the Judicial Committee of the Privy Council, the Courts Martial Appeal Court, the High Court and Court of Appeal (England and Wales and Northern Ireland), and the High Court of Justiciary (Scotland) and Court of Protection in particular roles.

== Application and section 10 ==
In A v Home Secretary, the detention of foreign nationals under the Anti-Terrorism, Crime and Security Act 2001 was ruled to be in contravention of Article 14 of the convention. They could be detained in circumstances British nationals could not, discriminating on the grounds of nationality. This discrimination was explicit and could not be interpreted to follow the Convention using Section 3. Accordingly, a declaration of incompatibility was made. In Bellinger v Bellinger, the court followed a European case, Goodwin v United Kingdom, in deciding that the failure to allow persons who had undergone gender reassignment to marry under the Matrimonial Causes Act 1973 was incompatible with Article 8 of the convention. Altering this would involve a "fundamental change in the traditional concept of marriage", which was the domain of the legislature and not the courts; accordingly, a declaration of incompatibility was issued. In R (Anderson) v Home Secretary, the court found that assigning the decision over the tariff of a mandatory life sentence to the Home Secretary was in breach of Article 6 of the Convention – however, he was explicitly given it under the statute, and it could not be removed merely by interpretation.

Under Section 4(6)(b), a declaration of incompatibility is not even "binding on the parties to the proceedings in which it is made". Since a declaration cannot invalidate or disapply legislation, it achieves its aim through political rather than legal means – it is for Parliament to correct the law, or continue to be in contravention of the convention. Section 10 provides one route for correction: "If a Minister of the Crown considers that there are compelling reasons for proceeding under this section, he may by order make such amendments to the legislation as he considers necessary to remove the incompatibility" (section 10(2)). It is designed to be a quick method; although it must be put before parliament, a remedial order does not require full legislative approval. This summary process was controversial, as it ignored the possibility for debate. However, the time required for this could not be provided in reality. In any case, approval is still required before the order comes into force, or, in the case of urgent legislation, within 120 days of it coming into force. A remedial order can only be made after a declaration of incompatibility or a similar finding of a European court, which will have been justified and discussed before being made. Under Section 10(1), all appeals must have been complete or expressly renounced.

Parliament has used Section 10 to make small adjustments where possible to bring legislation into line with Convention rights. In the Anderson and Bellinger cases, entirely new pieces of legislation were drafted and passed in the normal process, since they changed the law more considerably than the Section 10 process would allow.
