= MRN =

MRN may refer to:

== Businesses and organizations ==
- Macquarie Media (ASX: MRN), an Australian media company
- Michigan Radio Network, a satellite-distributed news service in Michigan, U.S.
- Migrants Rights Network, a London-based non-governmental organisation
- Motor Racing Network, the principal radio broadcasting operation of auto racing organization NASCAR
- National Regeneration Movement (Spanish: Movimiento Regeneración Nacional), a political party in Mexico

== Military ==
- AN/MRN-1, an instrument approach localizer used by the U.S. Army Air Force during and after World War II
- AN/MRN-2, a radio range set used by the U.S. Army Air Force during and after World War II
- AN/MRN-3, a marker beacon set used by the U.S. Army Air Force during and after World War II

== Science ==
- Magnetic resonance neurography, a medical imaging technique
- Median raphe nucleus, area within the brain
- MRN complex, a protein complex involved in DNA repair

== Other uses ==
- Foothills Regional Airport, IATA airport code
- Major Road Network, a proposed classification of local authority roads in England
- Moorabbin railway station,

== TV Shows ==
- Mister Rogers' Neighborhood
