= After Exploitation =

UK-based non-profit organisation

Coordinates: 51°28′6.17″N 0°7′3.09″W

After Exploitation is a UK-based non-profit organization that investigates the unpublished outcomes of modern slavery survivors. The group uses Freedom of Information requests to gather data on wrongful deportation, detention, and failures by agencies to refer victims for support. After Exploitation is a non-profit company limited by guarantee.

Their launch report revealed that 507 potential trafficking victims were detained in 2018. A follow-up investigation revealed that 1,256 potential victims were detained in 2019, marking a two-fold increase in the detention of vulnerable people since the introduction of safeguarding measures meant to reduce the use of immigration powers.

== Background ==
After Exploitation was founded as a volunteer-led project in July 2019. Its launch report, Supported or Deported?, reported the widespread use of immigration detention for potential survivors of modern slavery. The report received significant press and Parliamentary attention after the Immigration Minister had previously denied that such data existed. In response, over twenty non-profit organizations—including Amnesty International UK, Anti-Slavery International, and Freedom United—signed an open letter urging the government to release hidden data on survivors and reconsider the Home Office's role in delivering support.

== Investigations ==
In two separate briefings, After Exploitation has outlined documented cases of deportation and detention amongst trafficking victims. In 2018, 507 potential victims of trafficking were held in immigration detention, compared with 1,256 potential victims in 2019. Its investigation stated that more than half (53%) of potential victims leaving the UK before a final decision on their claim were held in prison-like immigration settings beforehand. In 2020, research by the group showed that thousands of potential slavery survivors are recognised by first responders such as the police or Gangmasters and Labour Abuse Authority as trafficked, but never referred for support through the NRM.

== Campaign ==
After Exploitation's Supported or Deported? campaign calls for the regular reporting of the following outcomes amongst survivors of modern slavery:

- Returns, including both voluntary and enforced
- Safety after return, monitored by NGOs commissioned through the UK's Voluntary Returns Scheme
- Immigration detention, including in cases where potential victims are not recognized as vulnerable in the Detention Gatekeeping stage
- Support outcomes, including the uptake of entitlements such as safe housing and counselling, enshrined under international law

Nearly 30 non-profit charities and campaigning organizations are signatories to these proposals, including Anti Slavery International, ECPAT, Equality Now, Hope for Justice, Migrant Rights Network, and Women for Refugee Women.

In November 2021, the group launched the #ScrapThePlan (later called #ScrapPart5) campaign. Its written goal was to "[encourage] MPs to share the concerns of survivors in the Lords, as the Bill is debated."
