= Simplified directional facility =

Aircraft approach

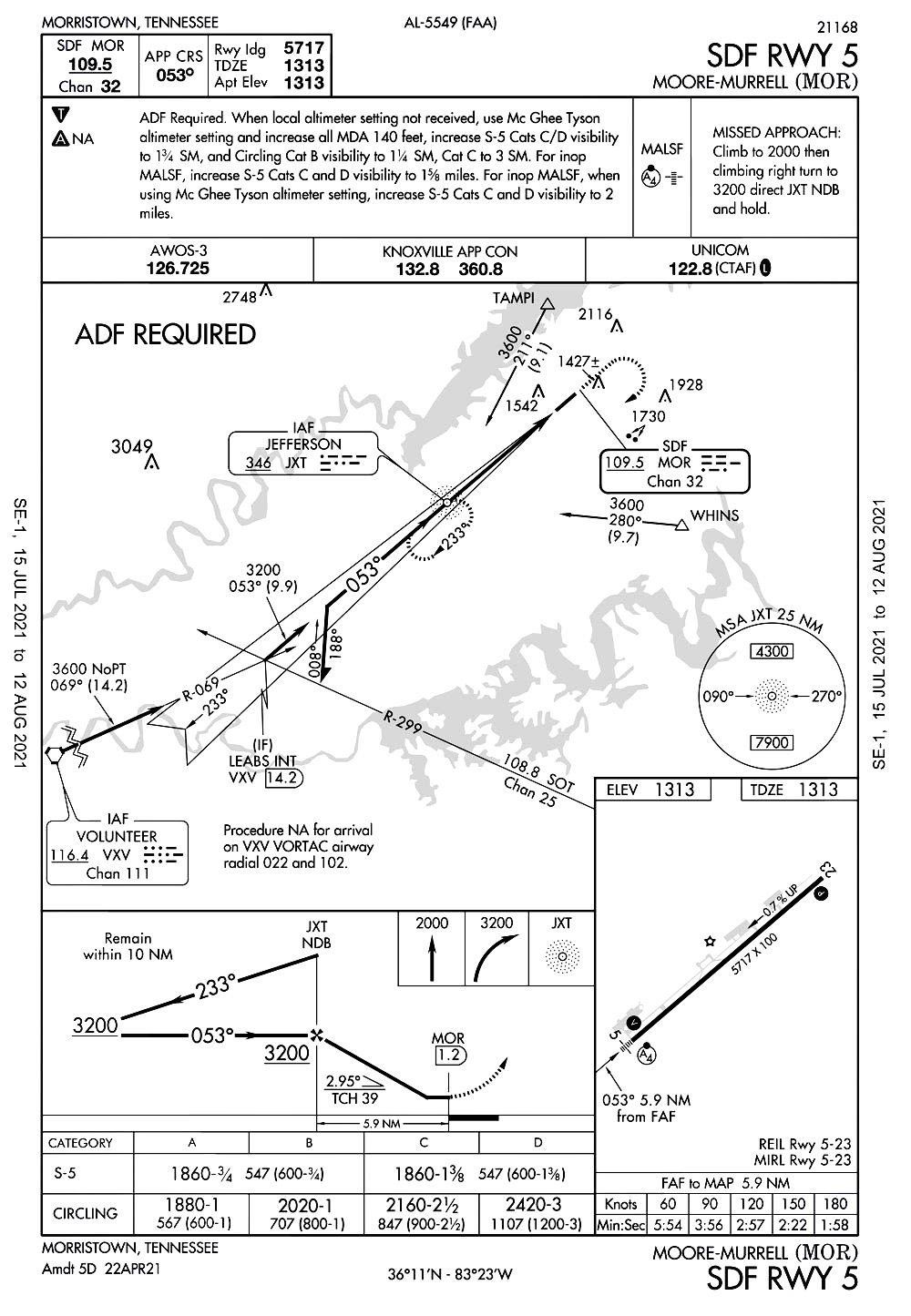
Morristown Regional Airport's SDF approach procedure to runway 5 before its decommissioning

Simplified directional facility (SDF) was a localizer-based instrument non-precision approach to an airport, which provided final approach course similar to instrument landing system (ILS) and localizer type directional aid (LDA) approaches, although not as precise.

The SDF signal was fixed at either 6 or 12 degrees, as necessary to provide maximum flyability and optimum course quality. Unlike an ILS, an SDF did not provide vertical guidance in the form of a glideslope. The SDF course may or may not be aligned with the runway because its antenna may be offset from the runway centerline. Usable off-course indications are limited to 35 degrees either side of the course centerline.

== Current SDF approaches in the United States ==
As of November 2024, the last SDF approach at Morristown Regional Airport (KMOR) was permanently decommissioned.

== See also ==
- Instrument approach
- Instrument landing system
- Localizer type directional aid
