= Space modulation =

Transmitting information with a carrier wave

Space modulation is a radio modulation technique employed in an Instrument Landing System (ILS) that uses multiple antennas to transmit signals with varying power levels and phase shifts. These signals combine in the airspace to create a pattern of varying modulation depths that correspond to different positions within the three-dimensional coverage area. This method differs from internal modulation techniques in traditional radio transmitters, where modulation occurs within the transmitter itself. In space modulation, the phase shifts and power variations of the signals interact in the airspace, allowing for precise positional determination by the aircraft's receiver.

Aircraft equipped with an ILS receiver within the coverage area of the system (including both the localizer and glideslope ranges) can detect varying degrees of modulation based on its position within the three-dimensional airspace. As the aircraft moves through this space, the receiver continuously monitors the phase shifts and power variations of the signals, providing real-time guidance for the approach.

== Method used to determine aircraft position ==
The ILS uses two radio frequencies, one for each ground station (about 110 MHz for LOC and 330 MHz for the GS), to transmit two amplitude-modulated signals (90 Hz and 150 Hz), along the glidepath (GS) and the course (LOC) trajectories into airspace. It is this signal that is projected up from the runway which an aircraft employing an instrument approach uses to land.

The modulation depth of each 90 Hz and 150 Hz signal changes according to the deviation of the aircraft from the correct position for the aircraft to touchdown on the threshold. The difference between the two signal modulation depths is zero when the aircraft is on the correct course and glidepath on approach to the runway—i.e. No difference (zero DDM), produces no deviation from the middle indication of the instrument's needle within the cockpit of the aircraft.
