= Society for Promoting Christian Knowledge =

UK-based Christian charity

- Abbreviation: SPCK
- Formation: 1698
- Founder: Thomas Bray
- Type: Church of England; Christian media Christian charity Christian mission
- Headquarters: Studio 101; The Record Hall; 16–16A Baldwins Gardens; London; EC1N 7RJ; United Kingdom
- Website: spckpublishing.co.uk

The Society for Promoting Christian Knowledge (SPCK) is a UK-based Christian charity. Founded in 1698 by Thomas Bray, it works to increase awareness of the Christian faith in the UK and worldwide.

The SPCK is the oldest Anglican mission organisation in the world, though it is now more ecumenical in outlook and publishes books for a wide range of Christian denominations. It is currently the third-oldest independent publisher and the leading publisher of Christian books in the United Kingdom.

== History ==
=== Foundation ===
On 8 March 1698, Rev. Thomas Bray met a small group of friends, including Sir Humphrey Mackworth, Colonel Maynard Colchester, Lord Guilford and John Hooke at Lincoln's Inn. These men were concerned by what they saw as the "growth in vice and immorality" in England at the time, which they believed was owing to the "gross ignorance of the principles of the Christian religion". They were also committed to promoting "religion and learning in the plantations abroad".

They resolved to meet regularly to devise strategies to increase their knowledge of Anglican Christianity. They decided that these aims could best be achieved by publishing and distributing Christian literature and encouraging Christian education at all levels.

Closely connected to the Church of England, the SPCK was not active in Scotland, where the Society in Scotland for Propagating Christian Knowledge was founded in 1709.

The SPCK sought to tackle a number of social and political issues of the time. It actively campaigned for penal reform, provided for the widows and children of clergy who died whilst overseas, and provided basic education for slaves in the Caribbean.

One of the key priorities for Bray and his friends was to build libraries in market towns. In its first two hundred years, the Society founded many charity schools for poor children aged 7–11. The Society also provided teacher training.

=== Evangelism overseas ===
SPCK has worked overseas since its foundation. The initial focus was the British colonies in the Americas. Libraries were established for the use of clergy and their parishioners, and books were frequently shipped across the Atlantic throughout the 18th century. In 1709, SPCK sent a printing press and trained printer to Tranquebar in East India to assist in the production of the first translation of the Bible into Tamil. This was accomplished by the German Lutheran missionaries Bartholomaeus Ziegenbalg and Heinrich Pluetschau from the Danish-Halle Mission.

As the British Empire grew in the 19th century, SPCK supported the planting of new churches around the world. Funds were provided for church buildings, schools, theological training colleges, and to provide chaplains for the ships taking emigrants to their new homes. While the SPCK supported the logistics of church planting and provided resources for theological learning, by the 19th century it did not often send missionaries overseas. Instead, this work was passed to other organizations such as its sister society the United Society for the Propagation of the Gospel (USPG), which was also founded by Bray. In Ireland, the Association for Promoting Christian Knowledge (APCK) was founded in 1792 to work alongside the Church of Ireland; in south India the Indian Society for Promoting Christian Knowledge (ISPCK) was established to support the Anglican missions in that region and is affiliated with SPCK.

During the twentieth century, SPCK's overseas mission concentrated on providing free study literature for those in a number of ministerial training colleges around the world, especially in Africa. The International Study Guide series was provided, free of charge, to theological training colleges across the world. They can still be purchased from the SPCK website, although the focus of SPCK's worldwide mission is now on developing the African Theological Network Press.

=== Supporting the Church of England ===
From the late 1800s to the early 20th century, SPCK ran a Training College for Lay Workers on Commercial Road in Stepney Green, London. This was set up to provide a theological education for working-class men, with the aim of better helping clergy to conduct services. It was also anticipated that with a firmer understanding of the Bible, theology and the values of the Anglican church, these men might be able to instruct their own communities.

Throughout the twentieth century, the SPCK offered support to ordinands in the Anglican church. These were men and women in training to become priests in the Church of England, who had fallen upon hard times and may have otherwise been unable to continue their studies. Today, this support continues through the Richards Trust and the Ordinands Library app.

=== Publishing and distribution ===
From its earliest days, the SPCK commissioned tracts and pamphlets, making it the third-oldest publishing house in England. (Only the Oxford and Cambridge University Presses have existed longer.) Very early on, SPCK member George Sale translated The Koran into English and this was published in 1734 by the SPCK, much to the praise of Voltaire.

Throughout the 18th century, SPCK was by far the largest producer of Christian literature in Britain. The range of its output was considerable—from pamphlets aimed at specific groups such as farmers, prisoners, soldiers, seamen, servants and slave-owners, to more general works on subjects such as baptism, confirmation, Holy Communion, the Prayer Book, and private devotion. Increasingly, more substantial books were also published, both on Christian subjects and, from the 1830s, on general educational topics as well.

Depositories were established at Great Queen Street, Lincoln Inn's Fields, Royal Exchange and Piccadilly.

SPCK's early publications were distributed through a network of supporters who received books and tracts to sell or give away in their own localities. Large quantities of Christian literature were provided for the Navy, and the Society actively encouraged the formation of parish libraries, to help both clergy and laity. By the 19th century, members had organized local district committees, many of which established small book depots—which at one time numbered over four hundred. These were overseen by central committees such as the Committee of General Literature and Education. In 1875 the addresses of their "depositories" in London were given as Great Queen Street, Lincoln Inn's Fields, Royal Exchange and Piccadilly, by 1899 they were at Northumberland Avenue, W.C.; Charing Cross, W.C. and 43 Queen Victoria Street, E.C.. Six years later, in edition 331, the depository was closed at Charing Cross, but a new one added at 129, North Street in Brighton.

In the 1930s, a centrally coordinated network of SPCK Bookshops was established, offering a wide range of books from many different publishers. At its peak, the SPCK Bookshop chain consisted of 40 shops in the UK and 20 overseas. The latter were gradually passed into local ownership during the 1960s and 1970s.

Holy Trinity Church, Marylebone, Westminster, London is a former Anglican church, built in 1828 by Sir John Soane. By the 1930s, it had fallen into disuse and in 1936 was used by the newly founded Penguin Books company to store books. A children's slide was used to deliver books from the street into the large crypt. In 1937, Penguin moved out to Harmondsworth, and the Society for Promoting Christian Knowledge moved in. It was their headquarters until 2004, when it moved to London Diocesan House in Causton Street, Pimlico. The bookshop moved to Tufton Street, Westminster, in 2003.

In 1999 the SPCK established the Assemblies website to provide resources for school assemblies.

On 1 November 2006, St Stephen the Great Charitable Trust (SSG) took over the bookshops but continued to trade under the SPCK name, under licence from SPCK. That licence was withdrawn in October 2007. However, some shops continued trading as SPCK Bookshops without licence until the SSG operation was closed down in 2009. In 2006 Alec Gilmore described what he called the "narrowing" of the SPCK's vision.

In 2019 the SPCK's "specialist medical, mental health and self-help imprint", The Sheldon Press, was acquired by Hachette UK.

=== SPCK's former book series ===
Book series published over the years have included the following:

- Alcuin Club: Collections
- Ancient History from the Monuments
- Apple Blossom Series
- The Bede Histories
- Bible Study Series
- Biblical Studies
- Canadian History Series
- Chit-Chat Series
- Chief Ancient Philosophies
- Christian Knowledge Booklets
- Christian Spirituality
- The Church Historical Society Series
- The Churchman's Popular Library
- Colonial Church Histories
- Commentary on the Bible
- Conversion of the West
- The Dawn of European Literature
- Diocesan Histories
- Earth's Many Voices
- Early Britain
- Early Church Classics
- Early Chroniclers of Europe
- Ecclesiastical Biographies
- English Theologians
- Exploring the Old Testament
- The Fathers for English Readers
- First Steps in General Knowledge
- Gospel and Culture
- The Heathen World and St. Paul
- Helps for Students of History
- Heroes of Science
- The Historic Monuments of England
- The History of the Ancient Peoples of the Classic East
- The Home Library
- Illustrated Hand-books of Art History
- Illustrated Notes on English Church History
- The Indian Church Commentaries
- Legends Revived
- Lessons on the Way for the Use of Inquirers and Teachers
- Library of Pastoral Care
- Little Books on Religion
- A Little Outline Of Christianity
- Manuals of Elementary Science
- Manuals of Health
- Missionary Stories Series
- Natural History Rambles
- The Nature Lover's Series
- New Library of Pastoral Care
- Non-Christian Religious Systems
- The Northern Lessons Series
- Notes on Famous Churches and Abbeys
- Notes on the Cathedrals
- One Shilling Series
- Pages From the Past
- Pan-Anglican Papers
- The People's Library
- Penny Library of Fiction
- Penny Pocket Library of Pure Literature
- The Picture Library
- Pioneers of Progress
- Poems of Child Life and Country Life
- Romance of Science Series
- Rose Series
- The Scholar in the Pulpit
- Sermons for the People
- Sheldon Series
- Short Stories Founded on European History
- Side-Lights of Church History
- SPCK Assemblies
- SPCK Cathedral Series
- SPCK Educational Books
- SPCK International Study Guides
- SPCK Orange Series
- The Story of The English Towns
- Studies in Church History
- Tales for the Nursery and the Young
- Texts for Students
- Theological Collections
- Theology Occasional Papers
- Translations of Christian Literature
- Translations of Early Documents
- Uniform Library Edition of Mrs. Ewing's Works (also known as: Authorised Edition of Mrs. Ewing's Works)
- Verse Books for Children
- What is Romanism?
- White Lily Series
- The Zoo

==== Based on lecture series ====
- The Croall Lectures
- Manchester Cathedral Lectures
- Moorhouse Lectures
- The Rhind Lectures in Archaeology
- Warburton Lectures
- The White Lectures, Delivered in St. Paul's Cathedral in 1933

=== SPCK's former periodicals ===
- The Child's Pictorial: A Monthly Coloured Magazine
- The Dawn of Day
- Golden Sunbeams: A Church Magazine for Children
- The Home Friend: A Weekly Miscellany of Amusement and Instruction
- The People's Magazine: An Illustrated Miscellany for Family Reading
- The Saturday Magazine

=== SPCK's former pedagogical aids ===
- Atlases
- Church History Cartoons
- Maps, "mounted on canvas and roller, varnished"

== SPCK in the 2020s ==
The SPCK's publishing team produces around 80 titles per year, for audiences from a wide range of Christian traditions and none. The SPCK publishes under its own name, SPCK Publishing, and via three main imprints, IVP, Lion Hudson and Marylebone House.

=== SPCK Publishing ===
SPCK Publishing is a market leader in the areas of theology and Christian spirituality. At present, key authors for SPCK include the Anglican New Testament scholar N. T. Wright, the former Archbishop of Canterbury Rowan Williams, Paula Gooder and Alister McGrath. Recent additions to SPCK's list include Guvna B, and Ben Cooley, founder of Hope for Justice.

SPCK is also increasingly gaining recognition in the secular space in genres such as history and leadership. SPCK represent authors such as Terry Waite, Melvyn Bragg and Janina Ramirez.

==== SPCK's current book series ====
In 2023 SPCK Publishing was issuing the following series:

- Discovering Series
- Food for the Journey
- For Everyone Series
- Modern Church Series

=== IVP ===
SPCK merged with Inter-Varsity Press (IVP) in 2015. IVP maintains its own board of trustees and editorial board. Key authors for IVP include John Stott, Don Carson, Amy Orr-Ewing and Emma Scrivener.

=== Lion Hudson ===
SPCK purchased Lion Hudson in 2021 which is now an SPCK imprint.

=== Marylebone House ===
In 2014, SPCK launched its fiction imprint, Marylebone House, which publishes a range of contemporary and historical fiction, short stories and clerical crime mysteries, with Christian characters and Christian themes.

=== Diffusion prison fiction ===
SPCK also owns the imprint Diffusion, which has published 12 titles especially commissioned for adults who struggle to read. These titles are divided into two series, "Star" and "Diamond". Star books are written for adults who are new to reading and need to improve their very basic skills, while the Diamond series is more appropriate for learners who want to develop their reading confidence further. All of the books are suitable for adults, but written in a style and typeface that is accessible to people with very basic literacy skills.

SPCK provides these books for free to prisons including to individual prisoners, prison libraries and prison reading groups. This is done with the aim of addressing two major causes of re-offending: lack of employment on release and lack of support from family and friends. At the end of each chapter, the Diffusion books contain questions which can be discussed in a reading group, thereby developing verbal communication and social skills. These questions focus on developing empathy by asking questions like "what would it feel like to be in that character's position?" and encourage self-reflection by asking "how does this example apply to my own life?".

By the end of 2018, the SPCK had sent Diffusion books to 70% of prisons in the UK. In 2018 alone, it sent out over 6,500 books.

=== The African Theological Network Press ===
Together with the Akrofi-Christaller Institute of Theology, Mission and Culture, the Jesuit Historical Institute in Africa and Missio Africanus, the SPCK founded the African Theological Network Press (the ATNP). The ATNP publishes theology written by Africans on topics that matter to African Christians.

The ATNP is a centralised commissioning and editorial unit, based in Nairobi. The material is distributed across Africa to be printed locally, which avoids the problems of localised publishing where books rarely make it outside the country in which they are published.

The ATNP seeks to mitigate the dependence of African theological study and teaching on publications from the global North.

== SSPCK in Scotland ==
The Scottish sister society, the Society in Scotland for Propagating Christian Knowledge (SSPCK), was formed by royal charter in 1709 as a separate organisation with the purpose of founding schools "where religion and virtue might be taught to young and old" in the Scottish Highlands and other "uncivilised" areas of the country. It was intended to counter the threat of Catholic missionaries and of growing Highland Jacobitism.

== Prominent SPCK members ==
- Steven East, chair of trustees
- Sam Richardson, CEO
- Bishop John Pritchard, former chair of trustees
