= LLZ =

LLZ may refer to:

- Localizer, a component of an instrument landing system (ILS) for the runway centreline, providing runway guidance to aircraft
- L. L. Zamenhof (1859–1917), the creator of Esperanto
