= Localizer type directional aid =

Type of instrument approach

Salt Lake City International Airport's approach plate, showing Localizer Type Directional Aid (LDA) for Runway 35. Note that the approach course is 344°, despite the runway being aligned at 349.1°. The airport also has a glideslope installed for this approach.

A localizer type directional aid (LDA) or Instrument Guidance System (IGS) is a type of localizer-based instrument approach to an airport. It is used in places where, due to terrain and other factors, the localizer antenna array is not aligned with the runway it serves. In these cases, the localizer antenna array may be offset (i.e. pointed or aimed) in such a way that the approach course it projects no longer lies along the extended runway centerline (which is the norm for non-offset and non-LDA localizer systems). If the angle of offset is three degrees or less, the facility is classified as an offset localizer. If the offset angle is greater than three degrees, the facility is classified as a localizer-type directional aid (LDA). Straight-in approaches may be published if the offset angle does not exceed 30 degrees. Only circling minima are published for offset angles greater than 30 degrees. As a "directional aid", and only a Category I (CAT I) approach, rather than a full-fledged instrument landing system (ILS), the LDA is more commonly used to help the pilot safely reach a point near the runway environs, where they hopefully can see the runway, at which point they will proceed and land visually, as opposed to (for example) full Category III (CAT III) ILS systems that allow a pilot to fly, without visual references, very close to the runway surface (usually about 100 ft) depending on the exact equipment in the aircraft and on the ground.

An LDA uses exactly the same equipment to create the course as a standard localizer used in ILS. An LDA approach also is designed with a normal course width, which is typically 3 to 6 degrees. (At each "edge-of-course", commonly 1.5 or 3 degrees left and right of course, the transmitted signal is created in such a way as to ensure full-scale CDI needle deflection at and beyond these edges, so the pilot will never falsely believe they are intercepting the course outside of the actual course area. The area between these full-scale needle deflections is what defines the course width.) An LDA approach (considered a non-precision approach) may have one or more marker beacons, perhaps a DME, and in rare instances a glide slope, just as other precision approaches have, such as ILS approaches.

If the offset is not greater than 30 degrees, straight-in approach minima may be published; circling minima only are published when offset exceeds 30 degrees.

== Approach with Vertical Guidance ==
If a glideslope is installed, the instrument approach chart will note "LDA/Glideslope", and the approach will be considered an Approach with Vertical Guidance. The approach minima will also be provided separately, listed as S-LDA/GS and S-LDA.

== List of LDA approaches in the United States ==
The following 25 LDA approaches are available in the United States (as of December 2025):

1. PAJN, LDA X RWY 08, Juneau International Airport, Juneau, AK
2. PAPG, LDA-D, Petersburg James A. Johnson Airport, Petersburg, AK
3. PASI, LDA RWY 11, Sitka Rocky Gutierrez Airport, Sitka, AK
4. PAVD, LDA-H, Valdez Pioneer Field, Valdez, AK
5. PAWG, LDA-C and LDA/DME-D, Wrangell Airport, Wrangell, AK
6. KFYV, LDA RWY 34, Drake Field, Fayetteville, AR
7. KBIH, LDA RWY 17, Eastern Sierra Regional Airport, Bishop, CA
8. KCCR, LDA RWY 19R, Buchanan Field, Concord, CA
9. KSNA, LDA RWY 20R, John Wayne Airport–Orange County, Santa Ana, CA
10. KTVL, LDA RWY 18, Lake Tahoe Airport, South Lake Tahoe, CA
11. KVNY, LDA-C, Van Nuys Airport, Van Nuys, CA
12. KEGE, LDA RWY 25, Eagle County Regional Airport, Eagle, CO
13. KGJT, LDA RWY 29, Grand Junction Regional Airport, Grand Junction, CO
14. KHFD, LDA RWY 02, Hartford–Brainard Airport, Hartford, CT
15. KDCA, LDA Y RWY 19, Ronald Reagan Washington National Airport, Washington, DC (No longer in use)
16. KDCA, LDA Z RWY 19, Ronald Reagan Washington National Airport, Washington, DC
17. PHNL, LDA RWY 26L, Honolulu International Airport, Honolulu, HI
18. KEKO, LDA/DME RWY 24, Elko Regional Airport, Elko, NV
19. KDLS, LDA/DME RWY 25 and COPTER LDA/DME RWY 25, Columbia Gorge Regional Airport, The Dalles, OR
20. KAMA, LDA RWY 22, Rick Husband Amarillo International Airport, Amarillo, TX
21. KSGU, LDA RWY 19, St. George Regional Airport, Saint George, UT
22. KSLC, LDA RWY 35, Salt Lake City International Airport, Salt Lake City, UT
23. KROA, LDA Y RWY 06 and LDA Z RWY 06, Roanoke Regional Airport, Roanoke, VA
24. KEKN, LDA-C, Elkins–Randolph County–Jennings Randolph Field, Elkins, WV
25. W99, LDA/DME-B, Grant County Airport, Petersburg, WV

== List of LDA approaches outside the United States ==
1. LQMO, IGS RWY 33, offset 21°, Mostar Airport, Mostar, Bosnia and Herzegovina
2. LSGS, IGS RWY 25, offset 6.5° Sion Airport, Sion, Switzerland
3. RJTT, LDA RWYs 22 & 23, offset 55° & 48° respectively, Tokyo International Airport, Tokyo, Japan
4. RCBS, LDA RWY 24, offset 15°, Kinmen Airport, Kinmen, Taiwan
5. RCFN, LDA RWY 04, offset 15°, Taitung Fongnian Airport, Taitung, Taiwan
6. RCSS, LDA RWY 28, offset 8°, Taipei Songshan Airport, Taipei, Taiwan
7. VMMC, LOC DME RWY 16, offset 54°, Macau International Airport, Macau SAR, China

== List of decommissioned LDA approaches ==
This list is incomplete

1. (X)VHHH, IGS RWY 13, offset 47°, Kai Tak Airport, Kowloon Bay, Hong Kong
2. LLBG, LDA RWY 30, offset 11°, Ben Gurion Airport, Tel Aviv, Israel
3. KVUO, LDA-A, Pearson Field, Vancouver, WA
4. BIAR, LDA RWY 01, offset 26°, Akureyri Airport, Akureyri, Iceland
5. NVVV, LDA RWY 11, offset 26°, Bauerfield International Airport, Port Vila, Vanuatu
6. EKVG, LDA RWYs 12 & 30, offset 14° & 2° respectively, Vágar Airport, Vágar, Faroe Islands
7. LYTV, LDA RWY 32, offset 20°, Tivat Airport, Tivat, Montenegro

== See also ==
- Instrument approach
- Instrument landing system
- Simplified directional facility
- Localizer
