= Andrew Alford =

American engineer and inventor (1904-1992)

- Born: Andrew Petrovitch Alexeievsky; August 5, 1904; Samara, Russia
- Died: January 25, 1992 (aged 87); Winchester, Massachusetts, U.S.
- Occupations: Electrical engineer, inventor

Andrew Alford (August 5, 1904 – January 25, 1992), born Andrew Petrovitch Alexeievsky, was a Russian-born American electrical engineer and inventor. He held over 100 patents by the end of 1954, and over 180 by the time he died.

== Early life and education ==
Alford was born in Kuibshev, Samara, then part of the Russian Empire. His parents died in the tumult surrounding the Russian Revolution, and he emigrated to the United States as a teenager. He graduated from the University of California in 1924, with further studies at California Institute of Technology in 1927 and 1928.

== Career ==
Alford worked for the Fox Film Corporation and Mackay Radio and Telegraph Company in the 1930s. He invented and developed antennas for radio navigation systems, now used for VHF omnidirectional range and instrument landing systems. He was the inventor of a balanced square antenna named the Alford Loop. During World War II, he worked on radar-jamming technologies for the military, at Harvard University's secret Radio Research Laboratory. He was founder of the Alford Manufacturing Company in 1948.

In 1965, the first Master FM Antenna system in the world, designed to allow individual FM stations to broadcast simultaneously from one source, was erected on the Empire State Building. The original system was co-invented by Alford and Frank Kear.

== Honors ==
Alford received an honorary doctorate from Ohio University in 1975. In 1983 he was inducted into the National Inventors Hall of Fame for his invention of the Localizer Antenna System, which guides aircraft during landings.

== Personal life ==
Alford married Helen Glaser in 1930, and became a naturalized United States citizen. He died in Winchester, Massachusetts, in 1992, at the age of 87.

== See also ==
- AN/MRN-1

== US Patents ==
- U.S. patent 2,682,050 Localizer Antenna System
