= Difference in the depth of modulation =

The difference in the depth of modulation (DDM) is used by instrument landing systems in conjunction with the associated airborne receiving equipment to define a position in airspace. DDM is usually expressed in percentage but may also be expressed in microamperes. The two individual audio modulation frequencies and their associated sidebands are 90 and 150 Hz. The DDM for a localizer at the outer extremity of the course sector is 15.5% or an electric current equivalent of 150 microamperes full scale deflection.

== Method ==
A modulation depth comparison navigational aid (MDCNA), also known as an Instrument Landing System, uses the concept of space modulation to provide guidance to aircraft when on final approach.

A carrier and sideband (CSB), and sideband only (SBO) signal, transmitted from localizer and glide path antennas produce a space-modulated signal resulting from the vectorial addition of two or more audio signals that vary according to position of the receiving aircraft. The difference between the two modulation depths produce an error current signal in the airborne receiver. When an aircraft follows the course line, the difference in the depths of the modulation between the two frequencies is zero. This difference is conventionally displayed by the deflection of a moving coil indicator or needle on an instrument known as a horizontal situation indicator (HSI).

== See also ==
- Amplitude modulation
- International Civil Aviation Organization (ICAO)
- Radio navigation
