= AN/MRN-1 =

Former landing aid of the US Army Air Force

The AN/MRN-1 was an instrument approach localizer used by the Army Air Force during and after World War II. It was standardized on 3 July 1942 replacing the SCR-241, and was a component of SCS-51.

In accordance with the Joint Electronics Type Designation System (JETDS), the "AN/MRN-1" designation represents the first design of an Army-Navy electronic device for ground mobile radio navigational aid. The JETDS system also now is used to name all Department of Defense electronic systems.

== Use ==
The transmitter provided a signal to guide the RC-103 equipped aircraft to the centerline of a runway. The set radiates two intersecting field patterns, one of which is modulated at an audio frequency of 90 cycles per second, and the other at an audio frequency of 150 cycles per second. The shape of the radiated patterns were such that they intersected in a vertical plane called the "course", which could be oriented (by positioning the truck) to intersect the ground in a line which coincides with the center-line of a landing runway. The range of the equipment was a function of the elevation of the receiving antenna: approximately 40 mi (64 km) at an elevation of 2,500 ft (760 m), 70 mi (110 km) at 6,000 ft (1,800 m), and 100 mi (160 km) at 10,000 ft (3,000 m). The transmitter, BC-751-A had a frequency range from 108.3 to 110.3 MHz (277 to 272 cm) with a power output of 25 Watts.

- AN/CRN-3 was the same equipment except without the K-53 truck, thereby making it air transportable, components were housed in a tent.

The emission patterns of the localizer and glideslope signals. Note that the glideslope beams are partly formed by the reflection of the glideslope aerial in the ground plane.

== Components ==
The AN/MRN-1 was mounted in a K-53 truck and was made up of the following components.

- BC-915 control box
- BC-751 radio transmitter
- BC-752 modulator and bridge
- BC-753 course detector fixed
- BC-754 course detector portable
- BC-755 field intensity meter
- BC-777 indicator (alarm)
- RC-109 antenna (5 alford loops in a horizontal plane)
- An SCR-610 was provided for ground communications
- Electrical power was provided by a PE-141 generator (115 volts)

== Aircraft components ==
The RC-103-A was an airborne localizer receiver used to indicate a landing course in conjunction with the AAF instrument approach system. Signals received from a transmitter, located at one end of the runway to be used, are fed into the cross-pointer indicator indicating "on course", "fly right" or "fly left". Audio indication was also provided.

Antenna system AS-27/ARN-5 was used with the dual installation of the localizer and glide path receivers. Antenna type AN-100 was used when only the localizer receiver was also installed in the aircraft.

- RC-103 components included:
  - Indicator I-101-C
  - BC-732 control box
  - BC-733 receiver with DM-53 dynamotor
  - AN-100 antenna (localizer only)
  - AS-27/ARN-5 antenna system (combination)

== See also ==
- AN/MRN-3
- Instrument landing system
- List of military electronics of the United States
- List of U.S. Signal Corps vehicles
- LORAN
- Radio navigation
- SCR-277
- SHORAN
- Signal Corps Radio
