= Instrument landing system localizer =

Guidance system for a landing aircraft

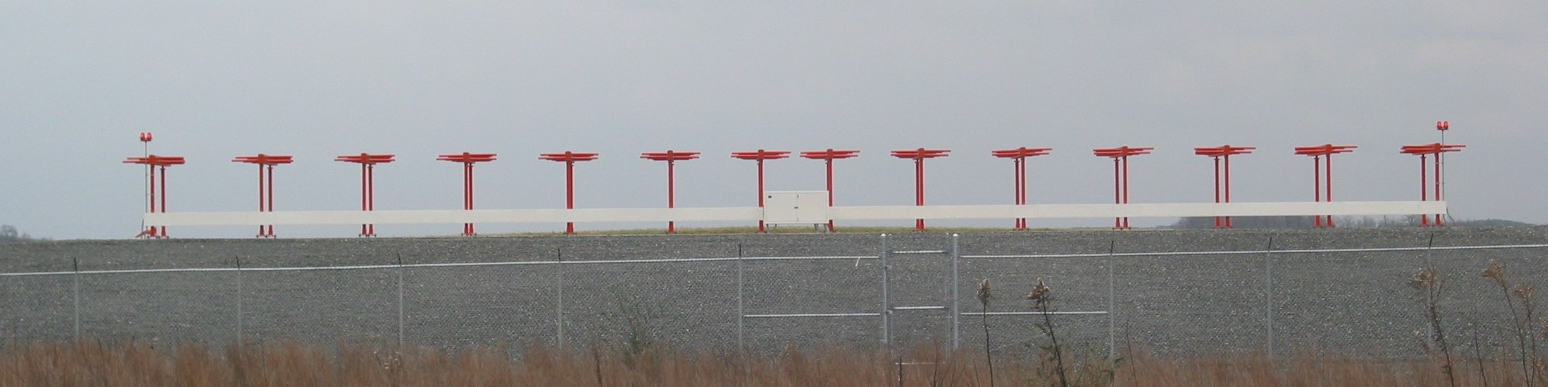
Localizer as component of an ILS (KMEZ runway 27, Mena, Arkansas)

Emission patterns of the localizer and glide path signals

An instrument landing system localizer, or simply localizer (LOC, or LLZ prior to 2007), is a system of horizontal guidance in the instrument landing system, which is used to guide aircraft along the axis of the runway.

== Principle of operation ==
In aviation, a localizer is the lateral component of the instrument landing system (ILS). It assists the pilot or autopilot in finding and following the runway centerline. It is combined with the vertical component of the ILS, the glide path. It is not to be confused with a locator, although both are parts of aviation navigation systems.

A localizer (like a glide path) requires both a transmitting airport runway system and receiving cockpit instruments. An older aircraft without an ILS receiver cannot take advantage of any ILS facilities at any runway, and much more importantly, modern aircraft with ILS instruments cannot use them at runways which lack ILS facilities. In parts of Africa and Asia even large airports may lack any kind of transmitting ILS system. Some runways have ILS only in one direction; this can still be used for horizontal centering when landing the opposite direction (with lower precision) and is known as the back beam or back course.

Two signals are transmitted on one of 40 ILS channels. One is amplitude modulated at 90 Hz, the other at 150 Hz. These are transmitted from co-located phased array antenna elements. Each antenna transmits a narrow beam. In addition, a clearing signal is transmitted at one tenth of the power with a wider beam to prevent receivers from picking up the side lobes of the main beam.

The signals' phases at the antenna elements are arranged such that the 150 Hz signal is more prominent (has a greater depth of modulation) at a receiver located to the right of centerline, and the 90 Hz signal is more prominent to the left. The cockpit instrument uses the difference between the modulation strengths of the two received signals to indicate left or right deviation from centerline.

== Carrier frequency pairings ==
Localizer (LOC) and glide path (G/P) (a.k.a. glide slope [G/S]) carrier frequencies are paired so that the navigation radio automatically tunes the G/S frequency which corresponds to the selected LOC frequency. The LOC signal is in the 110 MHz range while the G/S signal is in the 330 MHz range.

LOC carrier frequencies range between 108.10 MHz and 111.95 MHz (with the 100 kHz first decimal digit always odd, so 108.10, 108.15, 108.30, etc., are LOC frequencies and are not used for any other purpose).

== Localizer in cockpit ==
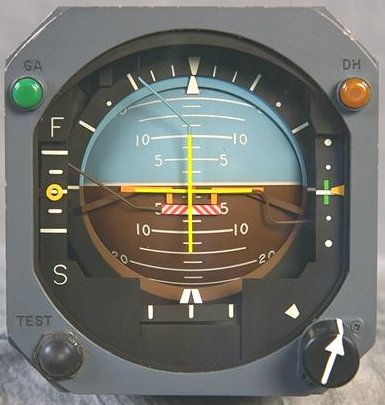
An attitude indicator (AI), more commonly known as an artificial horizon. The localizer is shown on the scale below the attitude gauge, appearing as a small white "^" sign. Both the indicator and its scale are small.

In an aircraft with an ILS, the navigation radio can be tuned to the ILS frequency of the desired runway during descent and approach. The localizer indicator will then show whether the aircraft is on the localizer beam transmitted from the airport, slightly to the left of the beam, or slightly to the right. At most airports, the localizer beam is directed in the heading of the runway, in which case the pilot (or autopilot) will adjust the heading towards the beam to position the aircraft for the approach.

=== Instruments ===
On most aircraft manufactured since the late 1950s, the localizer indicator is located below the Attitude Indicator as part of the same instrument, together with the glide path indicator. On aircraft with mechanical gyro compasses, the localizer and glide path are indicated as a vertical and a horizontal arrow in the compass. On some aircraft only the glide path is indicated on two main instruments, and the oldest version of ILS instruments was an instrument of its own used instead. This used two dangling bars, fixed in the middle of the top (localizer indicator) and in the middle of the left side (glide path indicator), and if the aircraft was located on the intended glide path, the dangling bars formed a cross. This is, in theory, more difficult to learn and even for experienced pilots added another instrument to focus on. With the indicators added to the artificial horizon and compass, the pilot can watch the attitude simultaneously with the localizer and glide path.

In modern cockpits, the localizer is shown as a colored marker (usually in the shape of a diamond) at the bottom of the artificial horizon during the descent and approach to the selected runway, provided that the navigation radio is set to the ILS frequency of that specific runway. If the aircraft is located on the localizer beam, the localizer marker will appear in the middle of the scale; if the aircraft is slightly to the left of the beam, the marker will appear to the right on the localizer gauge scale in cockpit, and vice versa, so that adjusting the heading toward the marker will move the aircraft closer to the localizer beam.

In older cockpits, the localizer scale below the artificial horizon is rather short but the localizer also appears as an arrow in the gyro compass below the artificial horizon. The top and bottom of this arrow move together and show the current heading but the middle part of the arrow moves independently as a localizer indicator, moving to the left if the aircraft is located to the right of localizer beam and vice versa. When the top, middle and bottom form a straight line, the aircraft is following the localizer beam.

The cockpit ILS indicators are not to be confused with the flight director, which also places vertical and horizontal lines on the artificial horizon. A flight director only shows how the autopilot would fly.

=== Autopilot ===
The expression "catch the localizer" refers to runway approaches with the autopilot engaged. The angle between the aircraft heading and localizer beam should be less than 30 degrees, and the indicated airspeed at least below 250 knots (for jet airliners), then by pushing a button marked "APP" or "ILS", then the autopilot will turn and then follow the localizer and descend according to the glide path. Normal procedure is to capture the localizer first and then follow the glide path as well. If the angle is too large or the airspeed too high, capturing the localizer may be unsuccessful.

== Localizer at runways ==
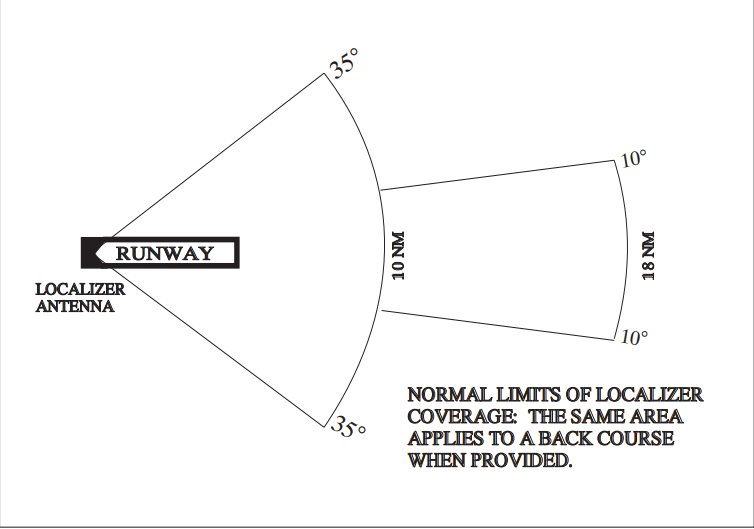
Limits of localizer coverage

When the glide path is unserviceable, the localizer element can often be conducted as a separate non-precision approach; or a standalone instrument approach installation without an associated glide path, both are abbreviated as 'LOC' (or 'LLZ' prior to 2007.)

== See also ==
- AN/MRN-1
- Andrew Alford
- Difference in the depth of modulation (DDM)
- Localizer type directional aid (LDA)
- Simplified directional facility
