= Women for Refugee Women =

UK charity

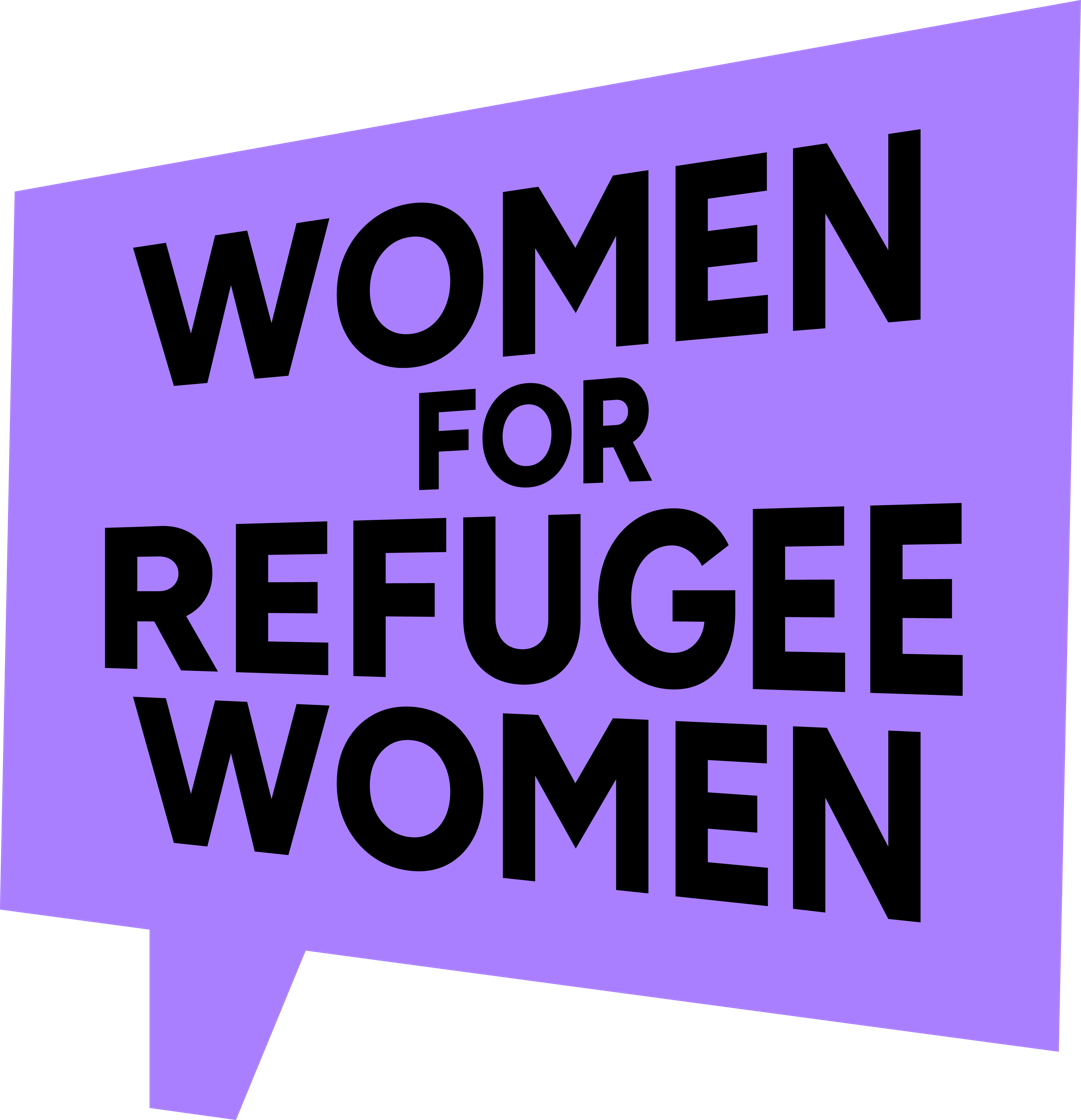
Women for Refugee Women Women for Refugee Women logo
- Founder: Natasha Walter
- Type: Charity
- Location: United Kingdom
- Website: www.refugeewomen.co.uk

Women for Refugee Women is a charity that supports women who are seeking asylum in the UK to rebuild their lives, on their own terms.

== Work ==
Women for Refugee Women (WRW) supports women who have fled persecution including rape, gender-based violence, domestic violence, forced marriage, female-genital cutting, sexual violence, torture, and trafficking. Every woman who joins WRW's network will be welcomed into their community space where they can join educational, skill-building and creative activities. Activities include English classes, yoga, drama, radical knitting and much more.

The charity also campaigns alongside refugee women to challenge the injustices they face whilst in the UK, including campaigns on asylum accommodation, immigration detention, asylum decision-making, and the right to work. This includes publishing research and briefing politicians to try and create a fairer asylum process.

Women for Refugee Women also works with the arts, media and public events to document and raise awareness about women's stories. This has resulted in WRW gaining coverage in a wide range of national press outlets, as well as speaking at national events and participating in creative arts opportunities throughout the UK. In 2016, Women for Refugee Women produced a short animated film, directed by Priya Sundram, which documents and raises awareness about the experiences of women who have survived sexual violence and torture, and are currently detained in Yarl's Wood.
