= AN/MRN-3 =

The AN/MRN-3 was a marker beacon set used by the Army Air Force during and after World War II, it was standardized 23 October 1943, and replaced SCR-241.

In accordance with the Joint Electronics Type Designation System (JETDS), the "AN/MRN-3" designation represents the 3rd design of an Army-Navy electronic device for ground mobile radio navigational aid. The JETDS system also now is used to name all Department of Defense electronic systems.

== Use ==
Each system requires three marker beacon sets, one to be located in the airport runway boundary, one at approximately one mile from the approach end of the runway, and one 4.5 miles from the approach end of the runway, all on the center line of the runway to be used. The equipment transmits a vertical pattern to be received by the RC-43, RC-193, or AN/ARN-8, AN/ARN-12. A signal, amplitude modulated at 1,300 cycles per second, may be keyed at two dashes per second, six dots per second, or may be unkeyed. The marker beacon transmitter projects a vertical fan-shaped pattern to a height of approximately 3,000 feet. The transmitter is placed so that the longer horizontal axis is perpendicular to the line of approach.

== Components ==
The beacon set is mounted in a jeep (Willys MB) and consists of

- RC-115 transmitter (BC-902-B)
- PE-88 generator or PE-214 generator
- an SCR-610 is provided for ground communications

== Aircraft components ==
- The RC-43-A (BC-357) is a UHF receiver which provides a visual indication when flying over a 75-MHz marker beacon. it operates in the frequency of 67 to 80 MHz. The receiver box is located with other radio equipment and lights a lamp on the pilot's instrument panel when over the beacon. the RC-43 is 24 volts, the RC-39 is 12 volts. the unit uses a fixed wire antenna.
- The RC-193-A (BC-1033) is the same, but a post-war version.

== See also ==
- AN/MRN-1
- Instrument landing system
- List of military electronics of the United States
- List of U.S. Signal Corps vehicles
- LORAN
- Radio navigation
- SCR-277
- SHORAN
- Signal Corps Radio
