= Hope for Justice =

Non-profit organisation

- Formation: 2008; 18 years ago
- Type: Non-profit organisation
- Purpose: End human trafficking and modern-day slavery
- Headquarters: Manchester, England, U.K.
- Region served: Cambodia, United Kingdom, United States, Norway, Australia, Ethiopia, Uganda
- CEO: Tim Nelson
- Staff: 420
- Website: hopeforjustice.org
- Remarks: "Hope for Justice, registered charity no. 1126097". Charity Commission for England and Wales.

Hope for Justice is a global non-profit organisation which aims to end human trafficking and modern slavery. It is active in the United Kingdom, United States, Cambodia, Norway, Australia, Ethiopia and Uganda and has its headquarters in Manchester, England.

Hope for Justice seeks to investigate and rescue trafficking victims, assist in aftercare, hold traffickers accountable, and campaign on a wider level to improve awareness and legislation. In the financial year 2021-22, Hope for Justice says it reached 199,894 people over 12 months through its outreach, prevention and aftercare projects.

Hope for Justice is described as a "major anti-trafficking organization" by Chris Smith (R, Hamilton Township), who represents New Jersey's 4th congressional district for the 117th United States Congress and who authored the Victims of Trafficking and Violence Protection Act of 2000 and several follow-on laws. Hope for Justice contributed to and endorsed H.R.6552, or the Frederick Douglass Trafficking Victims Prevention and Protection Reauthorization Act of 2022, introduced to Congress by Smith.

In 2020, Hope for Justice contributed to a multinational police operation co-ordinated by Eurojust, an agency of the European Union, in which 10 human trafficking suspects were arrested and female victims of sex trafficking were safeguarded in multiple countries.

After Russia’s invasion of Ukraine in February 2022, Hope for Justice published a rapid assessment report covering the risks of modern slavery for those displaced by the conflict. The charity also produced informational resources for Ukrainian refugees arriving in the UK and collaborated with other charities to launch a website called UkrainiansWelcome.org for those arriving in the UK from Ukraine to warn of the risks of trafficking. It led a coalition of more than 50 human rights and anti-trafficking charities globally to sign an open letter condemning the invasion and its impact on human trafficking risks for the most vulnerable and contributed to an evidence-gathering project led by the UK's Independent Anti-Slavery Commissioner on the same subject.

== History ==
Hope for Justice was co-founded in 2008 by Rob and Marion White, Ben and Debbie Cooley, Tony and Viv Jackson, Rob Allen, Chris Dacre, Martin Warner and Tim Nelson at an event called "The Stand" at the National Exhibition Centre near Birmingham.

In 2014, it merged with Abolition International and Transitions Global to become a worldwide organization to fight human trafficking. In 2018, the street children charity Retrak, active primarily in African countries, became part of Hope for Justice. Four other organizations have merged with Hope for Justice: Break The Cycle 200 in Des Moines, Iowa; aftercare housing and services provider Lily Pad Haven in Charlotte, North Carolina; For Freedom in Bergen, Norway; and No More Traffik in Northern Ireland.

== UK activity ==
Hope for Justice worked with West Midlands Police on the largest modern slavery prosecution in UK history, in which a gang thought to be responsible for trafficking up to 400 victims was jailed. Hope for Justice identified the first victims, leading to the whole network being uncovered, and eventually supported scores more.

Hope for Justice has three community engagement hubs in the UK, staffed by multilingual community engagement specialists plus trainers; one covering the East Midlands and based in Leicester; one covering North-West England and based in Preston; and another covering West Yorkshire and based in Bradford.

Hope for Justice also has an Advocacy team based in Manchester, staffed by people with backgrounds in social work and legal work and known as Independent Modern Slavery Advocates (IMSAs), a role which was developed and modelled internally at the charity, and which was independently evaluated by the University of Liverpool in June 2021. Based on the positive results of that evaluation, Hope for Justice partnered with British Red Cross and the Snowdrop Project to develop a framework for the accreditation of IMSAs in the UK at other organisations.

Hope for Justice’s training on modern slavery awareness, disclosure, and trauma-informed case reporting is CPD-certified.

== US activity ==
In the USA, Hope for Justice has Regional Centers in Nashville, Tennessee; Des Moines, Iowa; and Charlotte, North Carolina. These Centers are staffed by licensed investigators with law enforcement backgrounds, who have helped to solve several high-profile trafficking cases. They also provide anti-trafficking training to other frontline professionals, especially those involved with law enforcement, healthcare, government and community work. In 2022, Hope for Justice launched an online learning portal called the Hope for Justice Learning Academy, with free general awareness resources for the public and paid-for specialized training resources for professionals and businesses.

Hope for Justice helped to develop the "Protocol Toolkit for Developing a Response to Victims of Human Trafficking in Health Care Settings", which also informed a wider guide called "Improving Health Care Services for Trafficked Persons: The Complete Toolkit".

In 2023 Hope for Justice was awarded Charity of the year by the Public Interest Registry after reviewing 1000 charities in 70 countries. https://www.linkedin.com/posts/public-interest-registry_we-are-thrilled-to-celebrate-hope-for-justice-activity-7132791616364302340-spfJ

== Creation of Slave-Free Alliance ==
In 2018, Hope for Justice created a subsidiary called Slave-Free Alliance Ltd, a "not-for-profit social enterprise" offering services including site assessments, online resources, and technical consultations to help organisations protect their operations and supply chains against modern slavery. MAG, the owner of Manchester, London Stansted and East Midlands airports, credited the expertise of Slave-Free Alliance in enabling it to “independently review, benchmark and develop processes to help combat modern slavery”. Other Slave-Free Alliance members include Aviva, Experian, Dixons Carphone, Biffa, Morrisons, AstraZeneca and Arriva, and industries represented among the wider membership include professional services, engineering, data analysis, IT, utilities, energy, environmental services, manufacturing, agriculture, insurance, legal, pharmaceutical, property, recruitment, retail, transport and waste management.

In 2020, Slave-Free Alliance also launched in Australia, with its first member being the supermarket chain ALDI Australia. As of 2022, Slave-Free Alliance was reported to have 95 members, including 10 FTSE 100 companies.

== Dismissal of former CEO ==
=== Ben Cooley, co-founder and former CEO ===
On 28 May 2021 Hope for Justice announced that co-founder and CEO Ben Cooley's employment had been terminated following an investigation and disciplinary hearing. The charity revealed that although "the allegations were not of a criminal nature and no other members of the leadership team were implicated, they were determined to be serious and the Charity Commission was duly informed." On 3 June 2021 Civil Society News reported a UK Charity Commission spokesperson as saying "The charity has kept us informed throughout the independent investigation. We recently received an update to the serious incident report and are currently assessing this information. We cannot comment further at this time."

Ben Cooley publicly criticised the investigation and disciplinary hearing processes in the charity sector press saying, "I fundamentally disagree with the outcome" and "I wish that the process had been handled better and more consideration had been given to the fact that there was limited evidence available due to the historical nature of the allegation." Cooley also publicly posted on social media "I cannot agree with the decisions recently being made around my leaving Hope for Justice," and also said that it "is time for me to move on."

On 22 June 2021, however, Hope for Justice confirmed that an Appeal Panel had been convened but that they "upheld findings of gross misconduct against Hope for Justice co-founder Ben Cooley after an investigation into his behaviour while in the post of CEO". The charity stated that "In light of its detailed review, the Appeal Panel found no valid or credible challenge had been submitted to any part of the outcome of a Disciplinary Panel hearing held at the end of May 2021. Hope for Justice is therefore able to confirm Mr Cooley’s dismissal."

Commenting on the work of the investigation into Ben Cooley's conduct the charity stated that "The Disciplinary Panel found Mr Cooley’s actions to have amounted to gross misconduct in his behaviour towards several employees over a period of time, as well as irreparable breach of trust and confidence with the organisation. Sensitive personal details are being kept confidential to protect the identities and interests of the complainants and their families." Peter Elson, chair of the trustees at Hope for Justice, said "We are grateful that those affected ultimately felt able to come forward, for the courage they have shown, and that our whistleblowing policy has allowed them to do so discreetly and in confidence. We are committed to learn and grow from this experience and will do all we can to prevent misconduct and to promote a positive, respectful and inclusive environment and culture."
