= Migrants Rights Network =

Migrants' Rights Network
- Founded: 2006
- Type: Non-profit
- Location: London
- Services: policy initiatives, research, advocacy, network building
- Fields: Immigration, human migration, refugee
- Key people: Fizza Qureshi (Director)
- Website: http://www.migrantsrights.org.uk

The Migrants' Rights Network (MRN) is a London based non-governmental organisation working for a rights-based approach to migration.

MRN works with organisations across the UK, aiming to strengthen the voice of migrants in discussion and debates.

== Background ==
The need for a permanent network of migrant organisations in the UK was first identified through the discussions and research undertaken by the Barrow Cadbury Trust funded project entitled 'Migrant Community Organisations in the UK (MCOP)'.

The project explored the possibility for closer and better collaboration between different groups working in the field of migration to strengthen the voice of migrants in the UK. Especially since such organisations often have limited funding, and have been set up to support what are often beleaguered communities with high numbers of refugees and asylum-seekers and/or significant numbers of irregular migrants.

The outcome of the MCOP's work was set out in the report "Migrant Voices, Migrant Rights" published by the Barrow Cadbury Trust.
