= Glide path =

Guidance system for a landing aircraft

Emission patterns of the localizer and glide slope signals

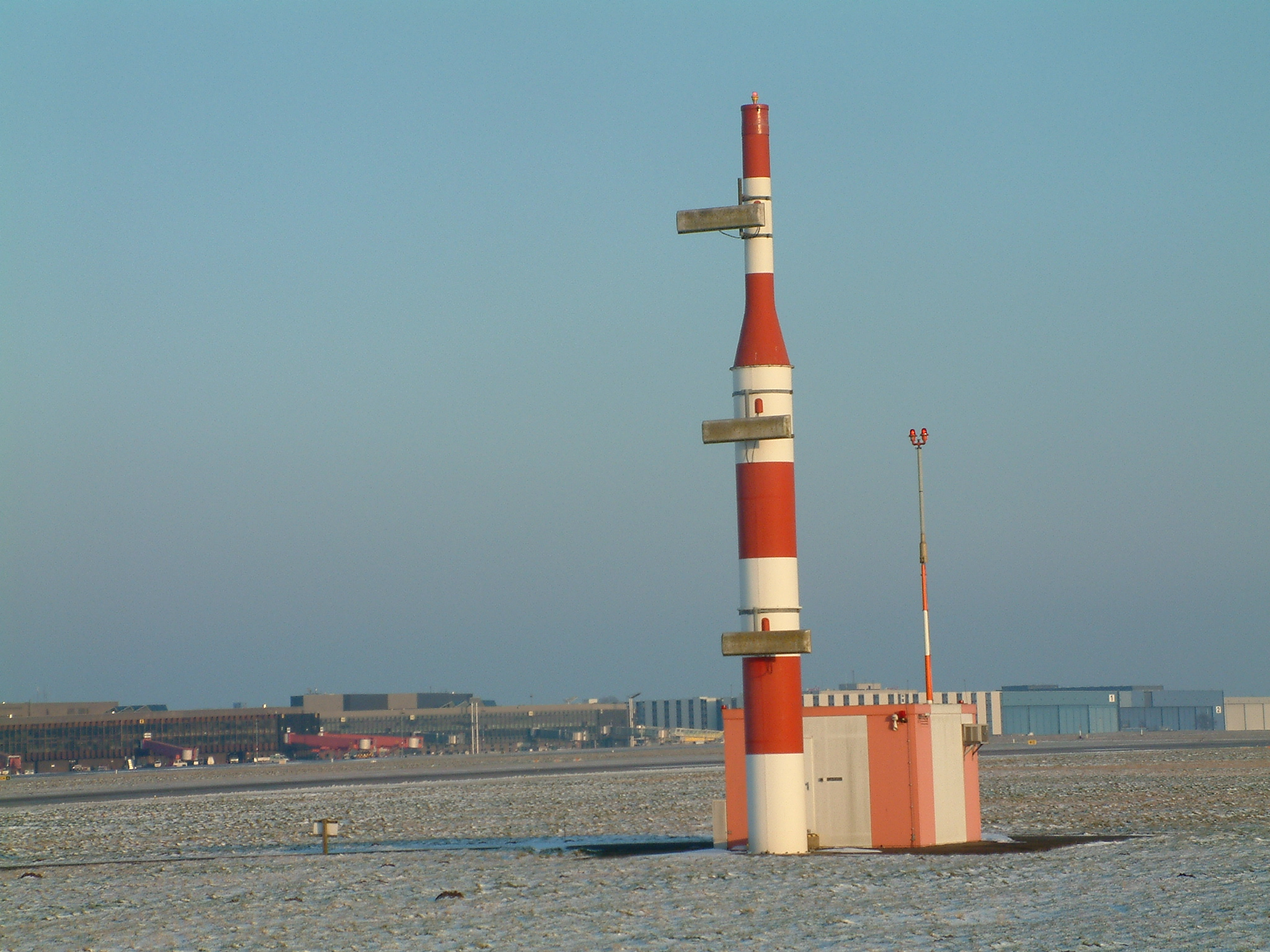
Glide slope station for runway 09R at Hannover Airport in Germany

In aviation, instrument landing system glide path, commonly referred to as a glide path (G/P) or glide slope (G/S), is "a system of vertical guidance embodied in the instrument landing system which indicates the vertical deviation of the aircraft from its optimum path of descent".

== Principle of operation ==
A glide slope station uses a phased antenna array sited on a tower which is offset approximately 250 to 650' to one side of the runway centerline and approximately 750 to 1250' beyond the approach end of the runway, adjacent to the runway touchdown zone. The GS transmits in the 328 to 336 MHz ultra high frequency (UHF) portion of the electromagnetic spectrum. Similar to the localizer, the GS signal is amplitude modulated with 90 and 150 Hz audio tones and transmitted on a carrier signal. The centre of the glide slope signal is arranged to define a glide path of approximately 3° above horizontal (ground level).

== Carrier frequency pairings ==
Localizer (LOC) and glide slope (G/S) carrier frequencies are paired so that the navigation radio automatically tunes the G/S frequency which corresponds to the selected LOC frequency. The LOC signal is in the 110 MHz range while the G/S signal is in the 330 MHz range.

LOC carrier frequencies range between 108.10 and 111.95 MHz (with the 100 kHz first decimal digit always odd, so 108.10, 108.15, 108.30, etc., are LOC frequencies and are not used for any other purpose).

Two signals are transmitted on one of 40 ILS channels. One is amplitude modulated at 90 Hz, the other at 150 Hz. These are transmitted from a phased array of co-located antennas.

== See also ==
- Difference in the depth of modulation (DDM)
- Final approach
- Radio station
- Radiocommunication service
- Visual Glide Slope Indicator
