= Special use airspace in the United States =

Airspace designated for specific use (United States)

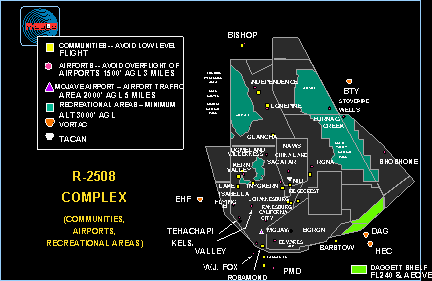
Map of special use airspace R2508 in the Mojave Desert, a Restricted Airspace.

In the United States, special use airspace (SUA) is a type of special airspace designated for operations of a nature such that limitations may be imposed on aircraft not participating in those operations. Often these operations are of a military nature. The designation of SUAs identifies for other users the areas where such activity occurs, provides for segregation of that activity from other users, and allows charting to keep airspace users informed of potential hazards.

Most SUAs are depicted on aeronautical charts and listed on FAA websites. Overlying Air traffic controllers can also provide SUA information.

== Types ==
The Aeronautical Information Manual includes the following SUAs:

Name	Purpose	Permission to entry	Example	Chart depiction	Notes
Prohibited Area	Established for security or other reasons associated with the national welfare	No aircraft may enter (Note: Unless authorization has been granted by the agency, organization or military command that established the requirements for the prohibited area. Such rarely authorized aircraft include the United States President's helicopter.)	P-40 surrounding Camp David	Name starts with "P-" and delineated with	The area may expand or shrink based on activities on the surface
Restricted Area	Denote the existence of unusual, often invisible, hazards to aircraft such as artillery firing, aerial gunnery, or guided missiles	Require clearance from the controlling agency	R-4808N surrounding Area 51	Name starts with "R-" and delineated with	
Warning Area	Extend from 3 nautical miles outward from the coast of the U.S., that contains activity that may be hazardous to nonparticipating aircraft.	Require clearance from the controlling agency when active		Name starts with "W-" and delineated with	May be located over domestic or international waters or both
Military Operations Area (MOA)	Separate certain military training activities from IFR traffic	VFR traffics may enter with caution; IFR traffic may be re-routed	Duke MOA	Name ends with "MOA" and delineated with	Military aircraft authorized to travel faster than 250 knots below 10,000 feet altitude
Alert Area	Inform nonparticipating pilots of areas that may contain a high volume of pilot training or an unusual type of aerial activity	Not required	A-211, flight training near Miami International Airport	Name starts with "A-" and delineated with	All activities strictly adhere to Federal Aviation Regulations with no waivers
Controlled Firing Areas (CFA)	Contain activities that may be hazardous to nonparticipating aircraft, but ceased immediately when spotter aircraft, radar, or ground lookout positions indicate an aircraft might be approaching the area	Not required	Non-aircraft ordnance disposal, blasting, and static testing of large rockets.	Not depicted on charts	
National Security Area (NSA)	Need for increased security and safety of ground facilities	Requested to avoid overflying	Portsmouth Gaseous Diffusion Plant	Thick dashed magenta lines	Flying may be temporarily prohibited

== Other airspace areas ==
A few airspaces that are considered neither special use airspaces nor the typical controlled / uncontrolled airspaces include:

Military Training Routes (MTR)
For military aircraft's training on “low level” combat tactics. The routes, normally established below 10,000ft MSL and allowing for operations greater than 250 kn (460 km/h; 290 mph), are further divided into IFR Military Training Routes (IR), typically above 1500ft AGL, and VFR Military Training Routes (VR), below 1500ft AGL. These routes are charted on IFR low altitude en route charts, VFR sectional charts, and Area Planning Charts

Temporary Flight Restrictions (TFR)
To protect persons and property in the air or on the surface from an existing or imminent hazard associated with an incident on the surface when the presence of low flying aircraft would magnify, alter, spread, or compound that hazard. These include public figure visits, disaster relieves, sports events, and space-launch missions.

Parachute Jump Aircraft Operations

Published VFR Routes
Help pilots transition around, under and through complex airspaces. These routes include “VFR Flyway”, “VFR Corridor”, and “Class B Airspace VFR Transition Route”.
- VFR Flyway: a general flight path in planning flights inside or near complex terminal airspace to avoid Class B airspace. ATC clearances are not required.
- VFR corridor: defined corridor through class B airspace. ATC communications or clearances are not required.
- Class B Airspace VFR Transition Routes: a specific flight course for transiting a specific class B airspace. These routes include specific ATC‐assigned altitudes, and pilots must obtain an ATC clearance before entering Class B airspace on the route. they are marked with ⇳ on VFR charts.

Terminal Radar Service Area (TRSA)
Not controlled airspace from a regulatory standpoint, but air traffic control radar services are available nonetheless.

Special Flight Rules Area (SFRA)
Certain designated airspaces with special air traffic rules for aircraft operating, as regulated by 14 CFR Part 93.

Weather Reconnaissance Area (WRA)
Established to support weather reconnaissance/research flights. ATC services are not provided within these areas. Only participating weather reconnaissance/research aircraft from the 53rd Weather Reconnaissance Squadron and National Oceanic and Atmospheric Administration Aircraft Operations Center are permitted to operate within a Weather Reconnaissance Area.

Air Defense Identification Zone (ADIZ)
An area of airspace over land or water, in which the ready identification, location, and control of all aircraft (except Department of Defense and law enforcement aircraft) is required in the interest of national security.

Altitude Reservation (ALTRV)
This airspace ensures non-participating IFR aircraft remain separated from special activity. Non-participating VFR aircraft are permitted to fly through the area with caution.

Air Traffic Control Assigned Airspaces (ATCAA)
Airspaces assigned by air traffic controllers for the purpose of providing air traffic segregation between the specified activities being conducted within the assigned airspace and other IFR air traffic.

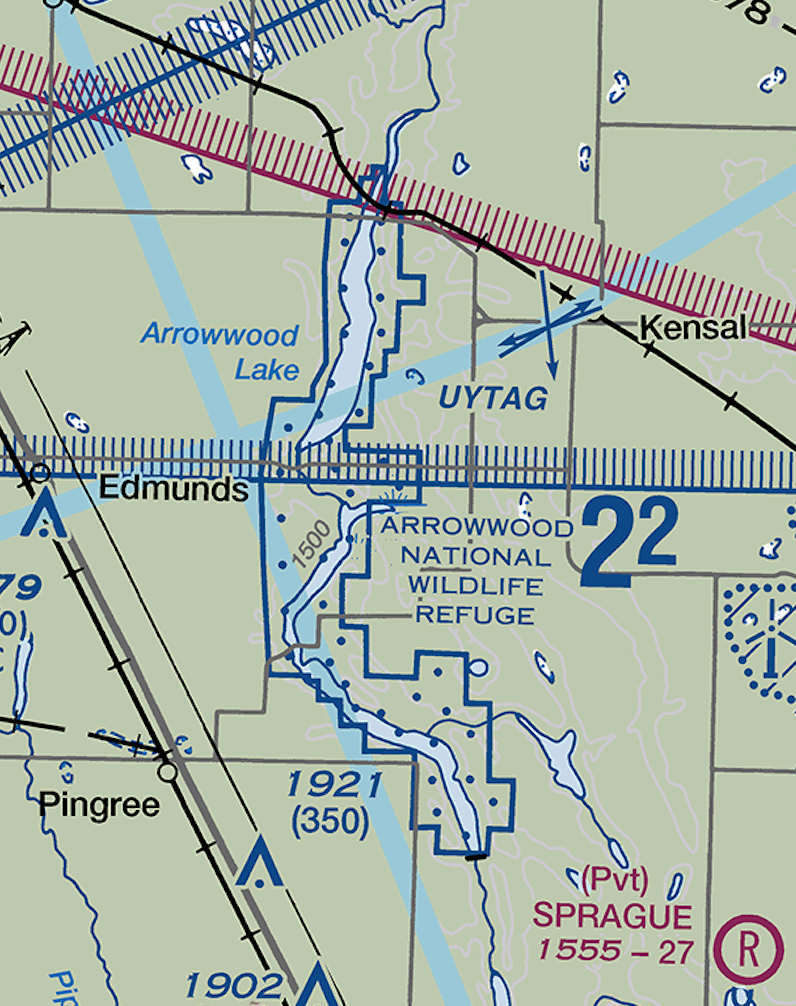
Noise-sensitive area near Arrowwood National Wildlife Refuge.

Noise-sensitive areas
An area is “noise-sensitive” if noise interferes with normal activities associated with the area’s use, such as National Parks, National Wildlife Refuges, Waterfowl Production Areas, and Wilderness Areas. FAA requests aircraft entering noise-sensitive areas to avoid overflying at low altitudes, specifically noise-producing aircraft (fixed-wing, rotary-wing, and hot air balloons) to fly at an altitude of at least 2,000 ft (610 m) above ground if weather permits.

== Charts ==
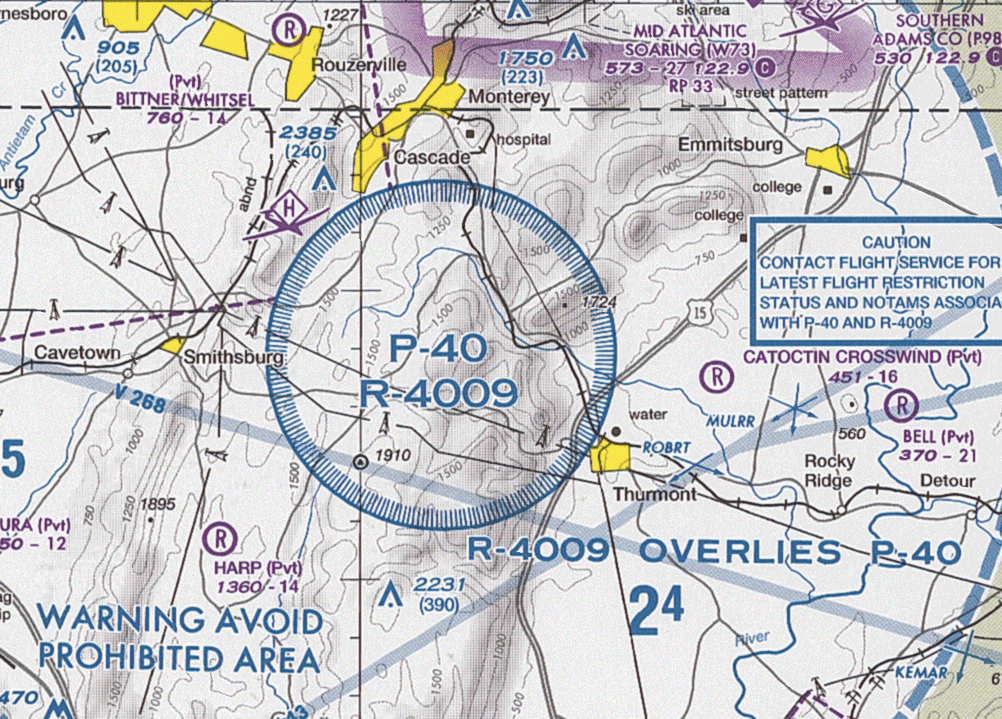
Prohibited Area P-40 near Camp David on an aeronautical chart.

All permanent SUA areas, except for controlled firing areas, are depicted on aeronautical charts, including sectional aeronautical charts, VFR terminal area charts, and applicable en-route charts, accompanied with the hours of operation, altitudes, and the name of the controlling agency. Controlled firing areas, temporary military operations areas, and temporary restricted areas such as Air Traffic Control Assigned Airspace (ATCAA) are not shown on the charts.

== Notices ==
In addition to charts, pilots can verify the status of permanent SUAs by contacting the using or controlling agency. These contact information are included in chart margins. Alaska's military operation runs Special Use Airspace Information Service to inform civilian VFR traffic about certain military operation areas and restricted airspaces within central Alaska.

For temporary or permanent SUAs requiring a NOTAM for activation, an airspace NOTAM will be issued, and pilots can check the SUA status via air route traffic control centers (ARTCC). If changes are made to the published airspace activation time, a Special Activity Airspace (SAA) NOTAM must be entered into Special Use Airspace Management System under the appropriate ARTCC, where SAA includes certain SUAs (restricted areas, military operations areas, warning areas, and alert area airspaces), military training routes, aerial refueling tracks and anchors.
