= Military operations area =

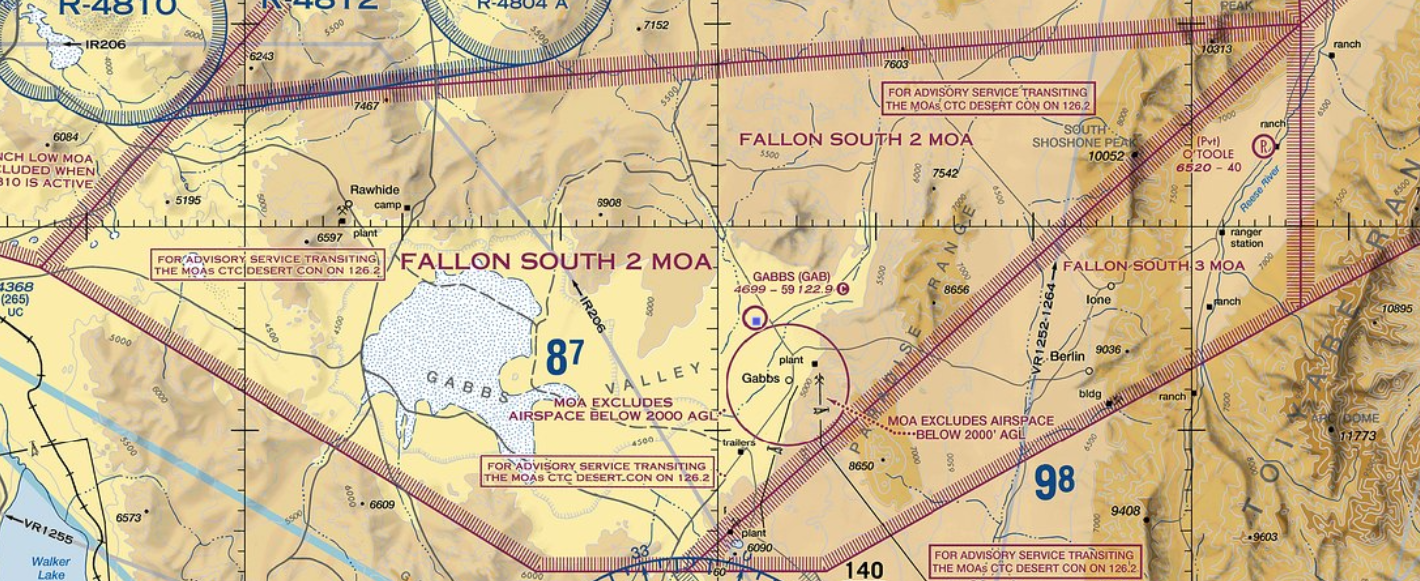
Fallon South 2 MOA on a FAA VFR map

A military operations area (MOA) is an airspace established outside Class A airspace to separate or segregate certain nonhazardous military activities from IFR Traffic and to identify for VFR traffic where these activities are conducted. Similar structures exist under international flight standards. These are designed for routine training or testing maneuvers. Areas near actual combat or other military emergencies are generally designated as restricted airspace. See Temporary Flight Restriction (TFR).

A MOA is a type of special use airspace (SUA), other than restricted airspace or prohibited airspace, where military operations are of a nature that justify limitations on aircraft not participating in those operations. The designation of SUA's identifies for other users the areas where military activity occurs, provides for segregation of that activity from other fliers, and allows charting to keep airspace users informed. Local flight service facilities maintain current schedules and contacts for the agency controlling each MOA.

MOA's are often positioned over isolated, rural areas to provide ground separation for any noise nuisance or potential accident debris. Each designated MOA appears on the relevant sectional charts, along with its normal hours of operation, lower and upper altitudes of operation, controlling authority contact, and using agency. The MOA system was established around mid-1970s after a few military-civilian aircraft midair collisions and near misses.

Whenever an MOA is active, nonparticipating IFR traffic may be cleared through the area provided ATC can ensure IFR separation; otherwise, ATC will reroute or restrict nonparticipating IFR traffic. Although MOA's do not restrict VFR operations, pilots operating under VFR should exercise extreme caution while flying within, near, or below an active MOA. Military pilots do, on occasion, underfly their prescribed MOA at lower altitudes without warning. Additionally, prior to entering an active MOA, pilots are encouraged to contact the controlling agency for traffic advisories due to the frequently changing status of these areas.

== See also ==
- European Aviation Safety Agency
- Federal Aviation Administration, United States
- International Civil Aviation Organization
- Military training route (MTR)
