= SFRA =

SFRA may refer to:

- San Francisco Redevelopment Agency
- Science Fiction Research Association
- Special Flight Rules Area, a type of U.S. aviation airspace with special restrictions
- Strategic Flood Risk Assessment
- Sweep frequency response analysis
