= Yucca Airstrip =

- IATA: UCC; ICAO: KUCC; FAA LID: NV11

Summary
- Operator: Department of Energy
- Location: Nevada Test Site, Nevada, United States
- Elevation AMSL: 3,919 ft / 1,195 m
- Coordinates: 36°56′45″N 116°02′16″W

Map
- Location of the airport in Nevada

Runways
Direction	Length		Surface
Direction	ft	m	Surface
01/19	4,990	1,521	Asphalt
14/32	9,000	2,743	Salt

Yucca Airstrip (IATA: UCC, ICAO: KUCC, FAA LID: NV11) is a private-use airport located 17 miles (27 km) north of the central business district of Mercury, in Nye County, Nevada, United States. The airport is located on the Nevada Test Site and is owned by the United States Department of Energy. On the sectional chart it is depicted as an unverified airstrip.

Many U.S. airports use the same three-letter location identifier for the FAA and IATA. However, this airport is assigned NV11 by the FAA but has been assigned UCC from the IATA.

== History ==
The airport was the staging area for Shot Badger, a test of the Upshot–Knothole Series of nuclear test shots on April 18, 1953.

== Facilities ==
Yucca Airstrip Airport covers an area of 41 acres (17 ha) and has two runways, one located on the salt flat and a shorter, more recently constructed asphalt runway just east of the salt flat:

- Runway 01/19: 4,990 x 75 ft (1,521 x 23 m), surface: asphalt
- Runway 14/32: 9,000 x 200 ft (2,743 x 61 m), surface: salt

The asphalt runway was constructed in 2002 as part of an unmanned aerial vehicle test facility.
