= World aeronautical chart =

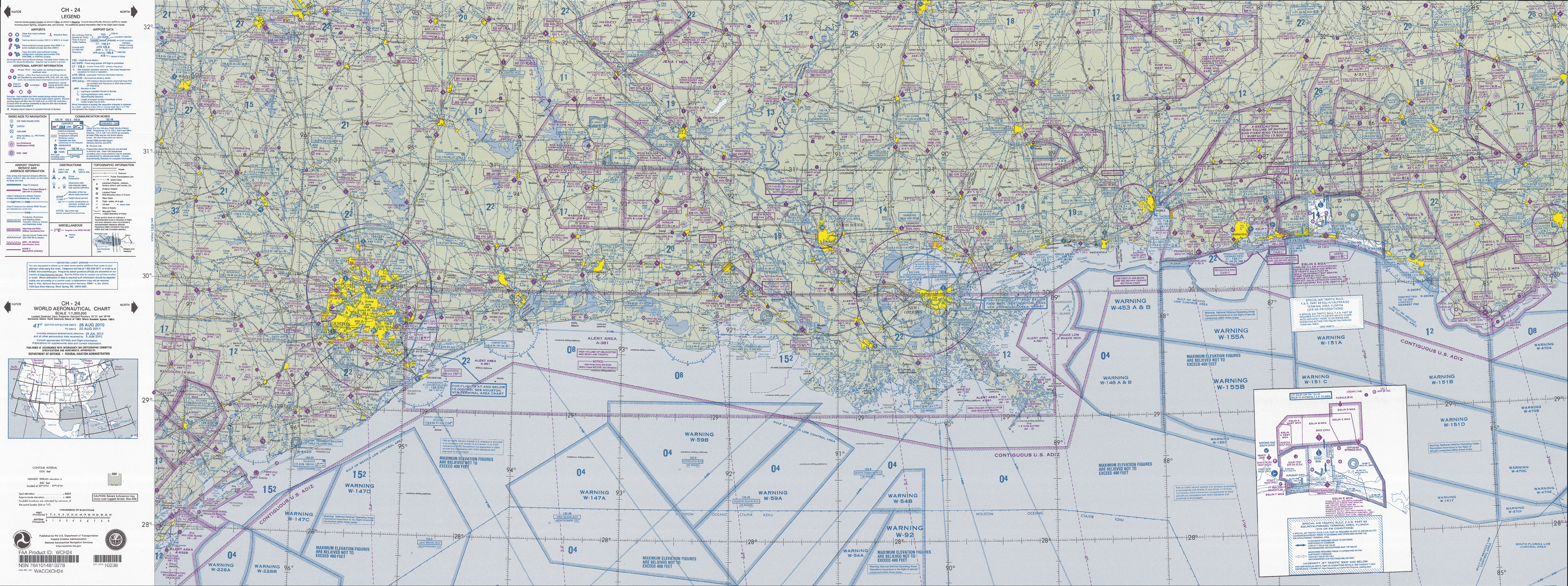
FAA World Aeronautical Chart, showing the northern part of the Gulf of Mexico

A World Aeronautical Chart (WAC) was a type of aeronautical chart used for navigation by pilots of moderate speed aircraft and aircraft at high altitudes in the United States. They are at a scale of 1:1,000,000 (about 1 inch = 13.7 nautical miles or 16 statute miles). WACs were discontinued by the Federal Aviation Administration (FAA) in 2015.

== Description ==
These charts are similar to sectional charts, and the symbols are the same. However, there is less detail at the smaller scale, so it is seldom used for visual flight rules flight at slower speeds or for local flights. WACs show topographic information, airports and radio navigational aids. They are useful for strategic flight planning, where a view of the entire flight area is useful.

These charts are revised annually, except for several Alaskan charts and the Mexican/Caribbean charts which are revised every 2 years. Australian WAC charts are amended every 3 to 5 years.

A set of 12 WACs covered the continental United States and 8 others covered Alaska. Canadian airspace is covered by a set of 18 WACs. The 43 Australian WACs are indexed according to a geographic name or a corresponding 4-digit number.

Unlike sectional charts, North American WACs are named according to an international "grid system" having a combination of letters and numbers. For example, WAC CF-16 covered the Pacific Northwest, and E-15 covers the British Columbia area. Letters progress from A at the North Pole to U at the southern tip of Argentina. The numbers generally progress from 1 at the Greenwich meridian and increasing to the east, to a maximum of 29, depending upon the number of charts required at that latitude.

== Discontinuance ==
On June 23, 2015, FAA officially stopped providing the World Aeronautical Chart due to a decline in interest and technological advances. Charts: CC–8, CC–9; CD–10, CD–11, CD–12; CE–12, CE–13, CE–15; CF–16, CF–17, CF–18, CF–19; CG–18, CG–19, CG–20, CG–21; CH–22, CH–23, and CH–24 ceased to be printed beyond September 17, 2015. Charts: CH–25; CJ–26, and CJ–27 production ended upon their next scheduled printing dates of December 10, 2015; February 04, 2016, and March 31, 2016 respectively.

== See also ==
- Index of aviation articles
- Moving map display
- Aeronautical chart conventions (United States)
- Operational navigation chart (ONC), which do not show controlled airspace boundaries
- International Map of the World, another millionth world map
