= NOTAM =

Aviation notice of potential flight hazards

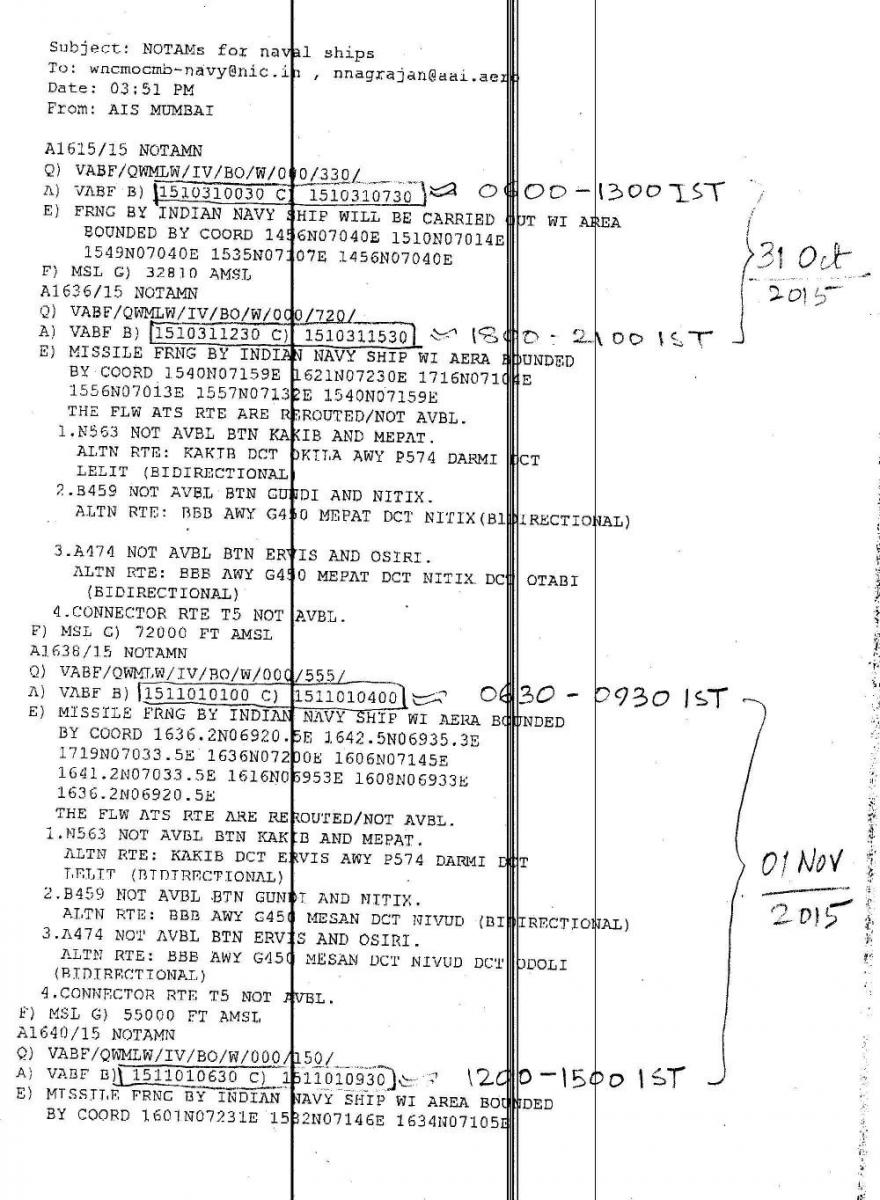
NOTAM for Naval ship

A NOTAM (officially meaning notice to air men, as used by the ICAO, FAA and the EASA; or notice to aviation as used by the CAA; and also previously known as notice to air missions in the United States) is a notice filed with an aviation authority to alert aircraft pilots of potential hazards along a flight route or at a location that could affect the flight. NOTAMs are notices or advisories that contain information concerning the establishment, conditions or change in any aeronautical facility, service, procedure or hazard, the timely knowledge of which may be essential to personnel and systems concerned with flight operations.

NOTAMs are created and transmitted by government agencies and airport operators under guidelines specified by Annex 15: Aeronautical Information Services of the Convention on International Civil Aviation (CICA). A NOTAM is filed with an aviation authority to alert aircraft pilots of any hazards en route or at a specific location, or flight information region. The authority, in turn, provides a means of disseminating relevant NOTAMs to pilots.

== History ==
The acronym NOTAM came into common use following the ratification of the CICA, which went into effect on 4 April 1947, although early recorded use of the "Notice to Airmen" heading can be found in Flight International magazine in the UK. Notices to airmen were normally published in a regular publication by each country's air authorities, as in the UK.

Several developments and amendments to the CICA have resulted in the more automated system available today. At some point in the past, the NOTAM system became web-aware.

In July 2017, Air Canada Flight 759 nearly crashed into four other airliners as it attempted to land on a San Francisco taxiway misidentified as a runway: the adjacent runway was closed, but the information was buried in the NOTAM. In September 2018, as a consequence of the findings of its investigation, the National Transportation Safety Board (NTSB) stated NOTAMs were unintelligible and ignored. The NTSB recommended more effective presentation of relevant information. NTSB chairman Robert Sumwalt described NOTAMs as "a bunch of garbage that nobody pays any attention to". This led to an initiative of the International Civil Aviation Organization (ICAO) to reform the NOTAM system.

In early 2014, Russia occupied Crimea and as part of the takeover, Russia issued a new code, URFV to cover the Crimean airspace. The Ukrainian air controller has since been forced to issue NOTAMs under the UKFV code (belonging to Simferopol FIR), basically a verbatim repeater. As a result, all the UKFV NOTAMs advising about this area affix this note:

DUE ACTIVITY PUBLISHED BY RUSSIAN FEDERATION.
THE PUBLICATION BY RUSSIAN FEDERATION OF INFORMATION 
RELATED TO AIRSPACE UNDER RESPONSIBILITY OF UKRAINE 
DOES NOT COMPLY WITH THE PROVISIONS OF THE ICAO 
AIR NAVIGATION PLAN - EUROPEAN REGION (DOC 7754) 
AND THE ICAO ANNEXES 11 AND 15.

In the run-up to the 2022 Russian invasion of Ukraine, Russian authorities closed large parts of the Black Sea, the Kerch Strait, and almost the entire Sea of Azov "for missile and artillery live fire exercises." A spokesman for the Ukrainian Foreign Ministry protested the Russian NOTAMs over this unprecedentedly large exercise area, which essentially obstructed international shipping and had economic consequences for Ukrainian ports such as Mariupol.

From December 2021 until February 2025, the meaning of the acronym was modified to "Notice to Air Missions" in the United States.

== Modernization - US NOTAM Management Service ==
Should the antiquated US NOTAM Service (USNS) fail, the FAA orders a ground stop for all US air traffic, as highlighted in the 'Incidents' section below. Full national ground stops impose severe economic and transportation penalties. To mitigate future incidents, the 118th Congress of the United States passed into law H.R.346 - NOTAM Improvement Act of 2023 which requires the FAA to conduct a taskforce by 30 September 2024 determining how to modernize both USNS and the Foreign NOTAM Service (FNS) in the US . The FAA's NOTAM Taskforce determined the need for a new, modernized NOTAM service and conducted a competitive prototyping Other Transaction Authority with industry through March of 2025 when they awarded the work to CGI Federal.

CGI Federal began work on a FISMA High Baseline accredited, fully containerized microservice, cloud-native, and ICAO compatible web application and infrastructure called "Notice to Airmen Modernization Service" (NMS) under the direction of a FAA Project Management Office dedicated to this task. NMS delivered initial machine-to-machine USNS API capability to a select group of government and commercial users on 30 September 2025. NMS launches global USNS service to individual public, organizational, and API users in mid-April 2026 with FNS service expected to be fully available by early fall 2026.

== Usage ==
NOTAMs are issued (and reported) for several reasons, such as:

- hazards, including air shows, parachute jumps, kite flying, lasers, rocket launches, etc.
- flights by important people such as heads of state (which sometimes involve temporary flight restrictions, TFRs)
- closed runways
- inoperable radio navigational aids
- military exercises with resulting airspace restrictions
- inoperable lights on tall obstructions
- temporary erection of obstacles near airfields (e.g., cranes)
- passage of flocks of birds through airspace (a NOTAM in this category is known as a BIRDTAM)
- notifications of runway/taxiway/apron status concerning snow, ice, and standing water (a SNOWTAM)
- notification of an operationally significant change in volcanic ash or other dust contamination (an ASHTAM)
- software code risk announcements with associated patches to reduce specific vulnerabilities

Aviation authorities typically exchange NOTAMs over Aeronautical Fixed Telecommunication Network (AFTN) circuits.

Software allows pilots to identify NOTAMs near their intended route or at the intended destination. Some complain that the volume and increasing triviality of NOTAMs has reduced their usefulness.

In the U.S. Air Force information technology enterprise, C4 NOTAMs (command, control, communications, and computer notices to airmen) are notices of new or updated Air Force Network Operating Instructions (AFNOIs). Often, these notices serve to direct Air Force computer administrators to install security updates or change the configuration of computer systems.

Flight planning applications for electronic flight bag can help decipher and better organize NOTAMs.

== Format ==
The following describes ICAO NOTAMs. NOTAMs are published using all upper case letters. Some countries, such as the United States, may diverge from the following ICAO standards.

- The first line contains NOTAM identification (series, sequence number, and year of issue), the type of operation (NEW, REPLACE, or CANCEL), as well as a reference to a previously issued NOTAM (for NOTAMR and NOTAMC only).
- The "Q" line holds information about whom the NOTAM affects, along with a basic NOTAM description. This line can be encoded/decoded from tables defined by ICAO. This allows NOTAMs to be displayed electronically.
- The "A" line is the ICAO code of the affected aerodrome or FIR for the NOTAM. The area of influence of the NOTAM can be several hundred kilometers from the originating aerodrome.
- The "B" line contains the start date and time, and the "C" line contains the finish date and time of the NOTAM. Fields "B" and "C" are in the format YYMMDDhhmm, with times given in Universal Co-ordinated Time, also known as UTC or Zulu time.
- Sometimes a "D" line may be present. This gives a miscellaneous diurnal time for the NOTAM if the hours of effect are less than 24 hours a day, e.g., parachute dropping exercises tend to occur for short periods of a few hours during the day, but may be repeated over many days.
- The "E" line is the full NOTAM description. It is in English but can be heavily abbreviated. These abbreviations can be encoded/decoded by tables defined by ICAO.
- When present, "F" and "G" lines detail the height/altitude restrictions of the NOTAM. Typically SFC means surface height or ground level, and UNL is unlimited height. Other heights are given in feet, flight level, or a combination of the two.

== Example ==
This is a typical NOTAM for London Heathrow airport:

A1234/06 NOTAMR A1212/06
Q) EGTT/QMXLC/IV/NBO/A/000/999/5129N00028W005
A) EGLL
B) 0609050500
C) 0704300500
E) DUE WIP TWY B SOUTH CLSD BTN 'F' AND 'R'. TWY 'R' CLSD BTN 'A' AND 'B' AND DIVERTED VIA NEW GREEN CL AND BLUE EDGE LGT. CTN ADZ

This decodes into the following:

Series and number: A1234 issued in 2006 (06)
Nature of the NOTAM: Replacing (R) NOTAM A1212 issued in 2006 (06)

FIR: London FIR (EGTT)
Subject: Taxiway (MX)
Condition: Closed (LC)
Traffic: NOTAM issued for IFR (I) flights and VFR flights (V)
Purpose: NOTAM selected for immediate attention of flight crew members (N), for PIB (Pre-flight Information Bulletin) entry (B), concerning flight operations (O)
Scope: Aerodrome (A)
Limits: FL 000 to FL 999 (000/999)
Geographical location: 51°29' N 000° 28' W (5129N00028W)
Operation radius of the NOTAM: 5 NM (005)

Aerodrome: London Heathrow (EGLL)

From: 05:00 UTC 5 September 2006 (060905 0500)
Until: 05:00 UTC 30 April 2007 (070430 0500)
Category: Aerodromes, air routes, and ground aids
Description: Due to work in progress (DUE WIP), taxiway "B South" is closed between "F" and "R" (TWY B SOUTH CLSD BTN 'F' AND 'R'). Taxiway "R" is closed between "A" and "B" (TWY 'R' CLSD BTN 'A' AND 'B') and is diverted via a new green centre line and blue edge lighting (AND DIVERTED VIA NEW GREEN CL AND BLUE EDGE LGT). Caution advised (CTN ADZ).

== U.S. domestic NOTAMs ==
In the United States, NOTAMs are classified by the FAA into five categories:

NOTAM (D) or distant NOTAMs
A NOTAM (D) information is disseminated for all navigational facilities that are part of the National Airspace System (NAS), all public use airports, seaplane bases, and heliports listed in the Airport/Facility Directory (A/FD) (e.g., such information as whether or not an airport or a certain facility is usable). NOTAM (D) information includes, among other topics, such data as taxiway closures, personnel and equipment near or crossing runways, and airport lighting aids that do not affect instrument approach criteria, such as VASI.

Flight Data Center (FDC) NOTAMs
The National Flight Data Center will issue these NOTAMs when it becomes necessary to disseminate information that is regulatory in nature, and they contain such things as amendments to published IAPs and other current aeronautical charts. They are also used to advertise temporary flight restrictions caused by such things as natural disasters or large-scale public events that may generate congestion of air traffic over a site.

Pointer NOTAMs
NOTAMs issued by a flight service station to highlight or point out another NOTAM, such as an FDC or NOTAM (D) NOTAM. This type of NOTAM will assist users in cross-referencing important information that may not be found under an airport or NAVAID identifier.

Special activity airspace (SAA) NOTAMs
SAA NOTAMs are issued when SAA (the term "SAA" includes SUA, as well as instrument and visual military training routes, aerial refueling tracks and anchors) will be active outside the published schedule times and when required by the published schedule.

Military NOTAMs
NOTAMs pertaining to U.S. Air Force, Army, Marine, and Navy navigational aids/airports that are part of the NAS.

=== Format ===
From left to right, U.S. NOTAMs contain the following elements:

- An exclamation point
- Accountability Location (using the FAA identifier)
- Affected Location (using the FAA identifier)
- One of the following keywords

Keyword	Meaning
RWY	Runway
TWY	Taxiway
RAMP	Terminal ramp
APRON	Airport apron
AD	Aerodrome/Airport
OBST	Obstruction
NAV	Anything relating to navigational equipment, e.g. VOR or NDB being out of service.
COM	Any other communications, e.g. ATIS.
SVC	When tower, fuel, customs service hours are available.
AIRSPACE	The airspace surrounding the affect location.
U	Other aeronautical information, but unverified.
O	Other aeronautical information.

- Surface Identification (i.e., the runway or taxiway number)
- Condition
- Time

These NOTAMS are likely to use FAA-specific abbreviations.

==== Examples ====
!ORT 6K8 (U) RWY ABANDONED VEHICLE

Tok Junction Airport has an unverified vehicle that is abandoned on its runway.

!LAX LAX NAV VOR OTS

Los Angeles International's VOR is out of service.

!OSH OSH AIRSPACE AIRSHOW ACFT 5000/BLW 5 NMR AIRPORT AVOIDANCE ADZD WEF 0707152000-0707152200

There is an airshow being held at Oshkosh airport with aircraft flying 5,000 feet and below within a 5 nautical mile radius. Avoidance is advised from 2000 UTC on July 15, 2007, until 2200 on July 15, 2007.

=== Incidents ===
On 11 January 2023, the US NOTAM system failed, which grounded all domestic flights until 9:00 AM EST (UTC-5) the same day.

== See also ==
- Air corridor
- Air defense identification zone
- Air traffic control
- Airspace
- Airway (aviation)
- Area control center
- Control area (aviation)
- Control zone
- Flight information region
- List of area control centers
- NOTAM code
- Notice to mariners—marine equivalent
- Terminal control area
