= Flight information region =

Specified region of airspace

Lower-altitude flight information regions of the world

In aviation, a flight information region (FIR) is a specified region of airspace in which a flight information service, an alerting service (ALRS, which provides coordination for distress, search and rescue), and an area control centre are provided. The International Civil Aviation Organization (ICAO) delegates which country is responsible for the operational control of a given FIR. FIRs are the largest regular division of airspace in use in the world today, and have existed at least since 1947.

Smaller countries' airspace is encompassed by a single FIR; larger countries' airspace is subdivided into a number of regional FIRs.

Some FIRs encompass the territorial airspace of several countries. Oceanic airspace is divided into oceanic information regions and delegated to a controlling authority bordering that region. The division among authorities is done by international agreement through the ICAO.

There is no standard size for FIRs. Some are merely vertical extensions of their respective countries, however small they may be, while others may extend far into the open ocean—it is a matter for the administrative convenience of the country concerned. In some cases there is a vertical division of the FIR, in which case the lower portion remains named as such, whereas the airspace above is termed an upper information region (UIR). Each country's aeronautical information publication specifies the boundaries and vertical extents of FIRs and UIRs.

A flight information service and an alerting service are the basic levels of air traffic service, providing information pertinent to the safe and efficient conduct of flights and alerting the different relevant authorities should an aircraft be in distress. These are available to all aircraft through an FIR. Area control centres provide higher levels of air traffic advisory and control services to certain portions of airspace within an FIR, according to the ICAO class of that portion of airspace (with regard to national regulations), and the existence of a suitably equipped authority to provide the services.

== See also ==
=== Related lists ===
- List of flight information regions and area control centers

=== Other links ===
- Area control center
- Air corridor
- Air defense identification zone
- Airspace
- Air traffic control
- Airway (aviation)
- Control area (aviation)
- Control zone
- NOTAM
- Terminal control area
