= UIR =

Uir or UIR may refer to:

- International Broadcasting Union (IBU); French: Union Internationale de Radiophonie, UIR
- Úr, an Old Irish letter
- University of International Relations, a public university in Beijing, China
- United Islamic Republic, a fictional nation in Tom Clancy's book Executive Orders
- Upper information region, airspace
- Unity and Renewal, political party in Andorra
- Unidentified infrared emission
- Université Internationale de Rabat (International University of Rabat)
- Quirindi Airport, IATA airport code "UIR"
