= En-route chart =

FAA low-altitude en-route chart for the Seattle region

In aviation, an en-route chart is an aeronautical chart that guides pilots flying under instrument flight rules (IFR) during the en-route phase of flight.

== Overview ==
An en-route (also known as en route or enroute) chart provides detailed information useful for instrument flight, including information on radionavigation aids (navaids) such as VORs and NDBs, navigational fixes (waypoints and intersections), standard airways, airport locations, minimum altitudes, and so on. Information not directly relevant to instrument navigation, such as visual landmarks and terrain features, is not included.

En-route charts are divided into high and low versions, with information on airways and navaids for high- and low-altitude flight, respectively. The division between low altitude and high altitude is usually defined as the altitude that marks transition to flight levels (in the United States, this is taken to be 18,000 feet MSL by convention).

Historically, they were called air navigation maps, airway maps, and flight charts.

== Area chart ==
In the United States, FAA also publishes area charts, which depict 14 congested terminal areas at a larger scale.

== See also ==
- Index of aviation articles
- Moving map display
