= Upper information region =

Flight information region

In aviation, an upper information region (UIR) is a flight information region in the upper airspace above each country's lower airspace. It is not regulated by the ICAO and boundaries are often not standardized.

The boundary between flight information regions and UIRs vary by country, but is usually above FL245 (24,500 feet) or FL660 (66,000 feet) depending on jurisdiction. They are used to manage high level traffic such as commercial airliners and military aircraft.

Some countries may have their boundary below FL245. In France, the boundary between the FIR and UIR in French airspace is FL195 (19,500 feet). On the other hand, countries such as Tunisia do not separate between lower and upper airspace, merging both FIRs and UIRs into one controlled region. In many cases, multiple FIRs can be merged into one UIR, such as in France where the Bordeaux, Reims, Paris, Marseille and Brest FIRs all being under the France UIR above FL195.

== See also ==
- Area control center
- Airway (aviation)
- Air corridor
- Control area (aviation)
- Control zone
- List of flight information regions and area control centers
- Terminal control area
