= Purple Corridor =

UK special aircraft zone

In United Kingdom aviation, a purple corridor is an area kept free from commercial or other aircraft to allow for the passage of royal or other VIP aircraft.

== Separation distance ==
It includes a stipulation that no plane takes off or leaves within 20 minutes of a royal plane.

It had a vertical clearance of 3,000 ft, and horizontal clearance of 20 miles in 1960.

== Incidents ==
On 25 October 1960, after a visit to Germany and Denmark, a Queen's Flight (32 Sqn) de Havilland Comet aircraft was 'buzzed' by two West German North American F-86 Sabre aircraft, at 30,000 ft, 20 miles north of Groningen Airport Eelde, near the German-Dutch border. The British pilot was Flight Lt Frank Stevens, who saw 'two aircraft with iron crosses' pass 50 feet above the Comet. Three West German Air Force officers arrived at RAF Lyneham, on 26 October 1960, to discuss the incident. RAF investigation staff arrived at RAF Wildenrath, for a meeting of the Second Allied Tactical Air Force at JHQ Rheindahlen in Mönchengladbach. The Germans had been told that the Comet would fly in the Amber airway from Heligoland to Groningen.

== See also ==
- Prohibited airspace
- British Royal Train
- Air transport of the British royal family and government
