= Federal Aviation Regulations =

Rules prescribed by the Federal Aviation Administration

The Federal Aviation Regulations (FARs) are rules prescribed by the Federal Aviation Administration (FAA) governing all aviation activities in the United States. FAA regulations comprise Title 14 of the Code of Federal Regulations (14 CFR). A wide variety of activities are regulated, such as aircraft design and maintenance, typical airline flights, pilot training activities, hot-air ballooning, lighter-than-air aircraft, human-made structure heights, obstruction lighting and marking, model rocket launches, commercial space operations, model aircraft operations, unmanned aircraft systems (UAS) and kite flying. The rules are designed to promote safe aviation, protecting pilots, flight attendants, passengers, and the general public from unnecessary risk.

== FAR vs. 14 CFR ==
Since 1958, these rules have typically been referred to as "FARs", short for Federal Aviation Regulations. Another set of regulations (Title 48) is titled "Federal Acquisition Regulations", and this has led to confusion with the use of the acronym "FAR". The FAA began to refer to specific regulations by the term "14 CFR part XX".

FAA Order 1320.46D (Advisory Circular System) Chapter 3, Section 10, paragraph h explains, "Do not use the acronym "FAR" to refer to FAA regulations. Neither the Department of Transportation nor the Office of the Federal Register allow us to use "FAR" for our regulations. The Federal Acquisition Regulations apply government-wide, and we are only allowed to use the acronym "FAR" for those regulations."

== 14 CFR overview ==
Title 14 CFR – Aeronautics and Space is one of the fifty titles that make up the United States Code of Federal Regulations (CFR). Title 14 is the principal set of rules and regulations (sometimes called administrative law) issued by the Department of Transportation and Federal Aviation Administration, which oversee aeronautics and space.

The table of contents, as reflected in the e-CFR updated December 20, 2018:

Volume	Chapter	Parts	Regulatory entity
1	I	1-59	Federal Aviation Administration, United States Department of Transportation
2	I	60-109	Federal Aviation Administration, United States Department of Transportation
3	I	110-199	Federal Aviation Administration, United States Department of Transportation
4	II	200-399	OFFICE OF THE SECRETARY, DEPARTMENT OF TRANSPORTATION (AVIATION PROCEEDINGS)
4	III	400-1199	Office of Commercial Space Transportation, FEDERAL AVIATION ADMINISTRATION, DEPARTMENT OF TRANSPORTATION
5	V	1200–1299	National Aeronautics and Space Administration
5	VI	1300–1399	Air Transportation Stabilization Board

== Organization ==
Each title of the CFR is organized into sections, called parts. Each part deals with a specific type of activity. For example, 14 CFR Part 141 contains rules for pilot training schools. The sections most relevant to aircraft pilots and AMTs (Aviation Maintenance Technicians) are listed below. Many FAA regulations govern the certification of pilots, schools, or aircraft rather than the operation of airplanes. Once an airplane design is certified under some parts of these regulations, it remains certified regardless of future changes to the regulations. For that reason, newer planes are certified under versions of the FAA regulations and, in many respects, may thus be considered safer designs.

- Part 1 – Definitions and Abbreviations
- Part 13 – Investigative and Enforcement Procedures
- Part 21 – Certification Procedures for Products and Articles
- Part 23 – Airworthiness Standards: Normal Category Airplanes
- Part 25 – Airworthiness Standards: Transport Category Airplanes
- Part 27 – Airworthiness Standards: Normal Category Rotorcraft
- Part 29 – Airworthiness Standards: Transport Category Rotorcraft
- Part 33 – Airworthiness Standards: Aircraft Engines
- Part 34 – Fuel Venting and Exhaust Emission Requirements for Turbine Engine Powered Airplanes
- Part 35 – Airworthiness Standards: Propellers
- Part 36 – Noise Standards: Aircraft Type and Airworthiness Certification
- Part 39 – Airworthiness Directives
- Part 43 – Maintenance, Preventive Maintenance, Rebuilding, and Alteration
- Part 45 – Identification and Registration Marking
- Part 48 – Registration and Marking Requirements for Small Unmanned Aircraft
- Part 61 – Certification: Pilots, Flight Instructors, and Ground Instructors
- Part 63 – Certification: Flight Crewmembers Other Than Pilots
- Part 65 – Certification: Airmen Other Than Flight Crewmembers
- Part 67 – Medical Standards and Certification
- Part 68 – Requirements for Operating Certain Small Aircraft without a Medical Certificate
- Part 71 – Designation of Class A, B, C, D, and E Airspace Areas; Air Traffic Service Routes; and Reporting Points
- Part 73 – Special Use Airspace
- Part 91 – General Operating and Flight Rules
- Part 97 – Standard Instrument Procedures
- Part 101 – Moored Balloons, Kites, Amateur Rockets, and Unmanned Free Balloons
- Part 103 – Ultralight Vehicles
- Part 105 – Parachute Operations
- Part 107 – Small Unmanned Aircraft Systems
- Part 117 – Flight and Duty Limitations and Rest Requirements: Flightcrew Members
- Part 119 – Certification: Air Carriers and Commercial Operators
- Part 121 – Operating Requirements: Domestic, Flag, and Supplemental Operations
- Part 125 – Certification and Operations: Airplanes Having a Seating Capacity of 20 or More Passengers or a Maximum Payload Capacity of 6,000 Pounds or More; and Rules Governing Persons on Board Such Aircraft
- Part 129 – Operations: Foreign Air Carriers and Foreign Operators of U.S. Registered Aircraft Engaged in Common Carriage
- Part 133 – Rotorcraft External-Load Operations
- Part 135 – Operating Requirements: Commuter and On Demand Operations and Rules Governing Persons on Board Such Aircraft
- Part 136 – Commercial Air Tours and National Parks Air Tour Management
- Part 137 – Agricultural Aircraft Operations
- Part 139 – Certification of Airports
- Part 141 – Pilot Schools
- Part 142 – Training Centers
- Part 145 – Repair Stations
- Part 147 – Aviation Maintenance Technician Schools
- Part 183 – Representatives of The Administrator
- Part 194 – Special Federal Aviation Regulation No. 120—Powered-Lift: Pilot Certification and Training; Operations Requirements
- Part 298 – Exemptions for Air Taxi and Commuter Air Carrier Operations

== Regulations of interest ==
=== Part 1 ===
Many other FAA regulations depend on definitions, which are found in Part 1.1

=== Part 21 ===
This part prescribes:

- (1) Procedural requirements for issuing and changing:
  - (i) Design approvals;
  - (ii) Production approvals;
  - (iii) Airworthiness certificates;
  - (iv) Airworthiness approvals;
- (2) Rules governing applicants for, and holders of, any approval or certificate specified above
- (3) Procedural requirements for the approval of articles.

=== Part 23 ===
Part 23 contains airworthiness standards required for issuance and change of type certificates for airplanes in these categories:

- nine or fewer passengers, 12,500 pounds or less maximum takeoff weight (MTOW)
  - normal: nonacrobatic operation (bank angle < 60°)
  - utility: limited acrobatic operation (60° < bank angle < 90°)
  - acrobatic: no restrictions
- commuter category: multiengine airplanes, 19 or less passengers, 19,000 pounds or less MTOW, nonacrobatic operation (bank angle < 60°)

In 2016, the FAA proposed a new system of performance-based airworthiness standards instead of prescriptive design requirements. The familiar weight-and-propulsion classifications in small-airplane regulations would be replaced by performance- and risk-based standards for aircraft weighing less than 19,000 pounds and seating 19 or fewer passengers. On August 30, 2017, a revised Part 23 ruling went into effect, changing the aircraft classifications. The new passenger classifications are: Level 1, seating for 0 to 1 passenger; Level 2, 2 to 6; Level 3, 7 to 9; Level 4, 10 to 19. Speed classifications are: low speed, Vc or Vmo equal to or less than 250 knots CAS and equal to or less than Mmo 0.6 Mach; high speed, Vc or Vmo greater than 250 knots CAS and Mmo greater than 0.6 Mach.

Prior to August 30, 2017, Part 23 had a large number of regulations to ensure airworthiness in areas such as structural loads, airframe, performance, stability, controllability, and safety mechanisms, how the seats must be constructed, oxygen and air pressurization systems, fire prevention, escape hatches, flight management procedures, flight control communications, emergency landing procedures, and other limitations, as well as testing of all the systems of the aircraft.

It also determined special aspects of aircraft performance such as stall speed (e.g., for single-engine airplanes – not more than 61 knots), rate of climb (not less than 300 ft/min), take-off speed (not less than 1.2 x V_{S1}), and weight of each pilot and passenger (170 lb for airplanes in the normal and commuter categories, and 190 lb for airplanes in the acrobatic and utility categories).

The Cessna 177, Cirrus SR20 and Piper PA-34 Seneca are well-known airplane types that were certified to standards set out in 14 CFR part 23.

Most of the Federal Aviation Regulations, including Part 23, commenced on February 1, 1965. Prior to that date, airworthiness standards for airplanes in the normal, utility, and acrobatic categories were promulgated in Part 3 of the US Civil Air Regulations. Many well-known types of light airplanes, like the Cessna 150 and Piper Cherokee, are certified to these older standards, even though they remained in production after 1965.

=== Part 25 ===
This part contains airworthiness standards for airplanes in the transport category. The Boeing 737 and later types, and Airbus A300 series, are well-known airplane types that were certified according to standards set out in 14 CFR part 25. Transport category airplanes are either:

- Jets with 10 or more seats or a MTOW greater than 12,500 pounds (5,670 kg); or
- Propeller-driven airplanes with greater than 19 seats or a MTOW greater than 19,000 pounds (8,618 kg).

This Part is organized into six subparts to specify design criteria for each of

- A – General
- B – Flight
- C – Structure
- D – Design and Construction
- E – Powerplant
- F – Equipment

For example, Part 25, Subpart D has section headings for

- General
- Control Surfaces
- Control Systems
- Landing Gear
- Floats and Hulls
- Personnel and Cargo Accommodations
- Emergency Provisions
- Ventilation and Heating
- Pressurization
- Fire Protection
- Miscellaneous

Most of the Federal Aviation Regulations, including Part 25, commenced on February 1, 1965. Prior to that date, airworthiness standards for airplanes in the transport category were promulgated in Part 4b of the US Civil Air Regulations, which was in effect by November 1945. Effective August 27, 1957, Special Civil Air Regulation (SR) 422 was the basis for certification of the first turbine-powered transport airplanes, such as the Boeing 707, the Lockheed Electra, and the Fairchild 27. SR 422A became effective July 2, 1958, and was superseded by SR 422B, effective August 29, 1959. Only a few airplanes were certified under SR 422A, such as the Gulfstream I and the CL-44. First-generation turbine-powered transport category airplanes such as the DC-8, DC-9, and B-727, were originally certified under SR 422B. SR 422B was recodified with minor changes to 14 CFR part 25, which became effective in February 1965.

=== Part 27 ===
This part contains airworthiness standards for rotorcraft in the normal category. Rotorcraft up to 7,000 lb MTOW and 9 or fewer passengers are type certified in this part.

Examples of rotorcraft certified in this part are the Robinson R44, Schweizer 300 and the Bell 429.

=== Part 29 ===
This part contains airworthiness standards for rotorcraft in the transport category. Rotorcraft with more than 7,000 lb (3,200 kg) MTOW and 10 or more passengers are type certified in this part. Rotorcraft with more than 20,000 lb (9,100 kg) MTOW must be certified to additional Category A standards defined in this part.

=== Part 91 ===
Part 91 defines a Part 91 Operator. These are the regulations that define the operation of small non-commercial aircraft within the United States, however, many other countries defer to these rules. These rules set conditions, such as weather, under which the aircraft may operate.

==== Section 91.3(b) ====
This regulation states that the pilot-in-command is the party directly responsible for, and is the final authority as to, an aircraft being operated.

Additionally, this regulation states that in an emergency requiring immediate action, the pilot-in-command may deviate from any regulation in Part 91 to the extent necessary to handle the emergency.

==== Temporary flight restrictions ====
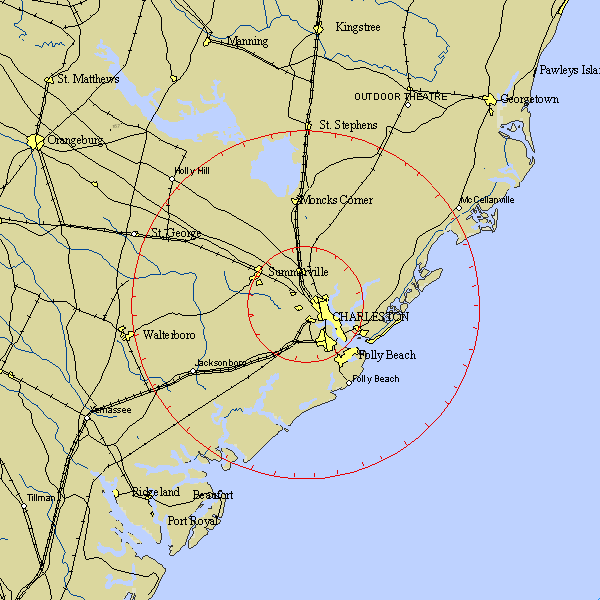
Example of a presidential TFR surrounding Charleston, South Carolina

The pertinent sections of the FAA regulations (14 CFR Sections 91.137, 91.138, 91.139, 91.141, 91.143, 91.145, 99.7) describe temporary flight restrictions (TFR). A TFR is a geographically limited, short-term airspace restriction, typically in the United States. Temporary flight restrictions often encompass major sporting events, natural disaster areas, air shows, space launches, and Presidential movements. Before the September 11, 2001 attacks, most TFRs were in the interest of safety to flying aircraft with occasional small restrictions for Presidential movements. Since 9/11, TFRs have been routinely used to restrict airspace for 30 nautical miles around the President, with a 10-nautical-mile (18.5 km) radius no-fly zone for non-scheduled flights. They are also available to other high-profile figures such as presidential and vice-presidential candidates (though not all do so, as Senator John Kerry, who did not ask for any TFR during the 2004 election).

TFRs are deeply unpopular with pilots in the general aviation sector. Presidential TFRs are nearly 70 miles in diameter, and frequently close off not only the airport Air Force One is using but nearby airports as well. Others, including the Transportation Security Administration, argue that they are necessary for national security. TFRs can also be instituted for special military operations, such as with the 2023 Chinese balloon incident, where the FAA put into place one of the largest airspace restrictions in U.S. history, with an area approximately twice the size of Massachusetts and more than five times the restricted airspace surrounding Washington, D.C.

The responsibility for screening requests for TFR and for subsequent granting or denying them, lies with the FAA's Office of System Operations Security.

==== Two-way radio communications failure ====
Section 91.185 of the Federal Aviation Restrictions deals with loss of radio communications while in flight. If a loss of radio communications were to be encountered during VFR conditions, or if VFR conditions are encountered after loss of communication with the ground and other aircraft, the pilot of the aircraft shall continue the flight under VFR and land as soon as practicable. If, however, the failure occurs in IFR conditions and/or the VFR conditions are not forthcoming, the pilot should continue under the following conditions:

- Route – The pilot will follow:

- The route assigned in the last contact with ATC before loss of communication, or, if being radar vectored, continue direct to the radar fix specified in the vector clearance;
- In the absence of an assigned route, the pilot will follow the route advised by ATC;
- In the absence of an ATC assigned or advised route, the pilot will follow the route set down in the flight plan.

- Altitude – The pilot will continue at the highest of the following altitudes or flight levels:

- The altitude assigned in the last contact with ATC before loss of communication;
- The minimum altitude for IFR operations;
- The altitude advised by ATC to be expected in a further clearance.

== Private, commuter, and commercial operations ==
For all pilots, there is an important distinction in the parts that address classes of flight. These parts do not distinguish the type of aircraft, but rather the type of activity performed with the aircraft. Regulations for commuter and commercial aviation are far more intensive than those for general aviation, and specific training is required. Hence, flights are often referred to as Part XX operations, to specify which one of the different sets of rules applies in a particular case. Also, flight schools will often designate themselves as Part 61 or Part 141 to distinguish between different levels of training and different study programs they could offer to the students.

Part 61 is certification for all pilots, flight instructors, and ground instructors.

Part 63 is certification for flight crewmembers other than pilots; such as flight engineers and flight navigators.

Part 65 is certification for airmen other than flight crewmembers; such as Air Traffic Control Tower Operators, Aircraft Dispatchers, Mechanics, Repairmen and Parachute Riggers.

Part 91 is general operating rules for all aircraft. General aviation flights are conducted under this part. Part 91, Subpart (K) prescribes operating rules for fractional ownership programs.

Part 107 (FAA sUAS Part 107) specifies regulations to fly under the Small UAS Rule, or small unmanned aircraft systems in the National Airspace System (NAS). Small unmanned aircraft systems (sUAS) are those that weigh less than 55 pounds.

Part 117 specifies flight and duty-time limitations and rest requirements for flightcrew members.

Part 121 defines regularly scheduled air carriers. These are airlines who operate scheduled flights carrying either cargo or more than nine passengers. Among the many Part 121 rules, pilots must carry an Airline Transport Pilot certificate and must retire by age 65.

Part 133 is external load (helicopter) operations.

Part 135 defines commuter and charter-type air carriers. These airlines can fly scheduled operations with aircraft with up to nine passengers (commuter flights), or they can fly on-demand, unscheduled air service for freight or with up to 30 passengers (charter flights). The Part 135 rules for pilots are less onerous, compared to Part 121: only 250 hours of flight time are required for a pilot to serve as first officer on a Part 135 flight and pilots are not subject to a mandatory retirement age. Additionally, Part 135 operators have lower TSA screening requirements for passengers. Part 135 operators may not sell individual seats on charter flights. Applicants for a Part 135 certificate must have exclusive use of at least one aircraft.

Part 141 is a more structured method for pilot training, based on FAA syllabus and other standards.

== Maintenance ==
Part 21 is certification procedures for products and parts.

Part 39 is airworthiness directives.

Part 43 is maintenance, preventive maintenance, rebuilding, and alteration.

Part 145 contains the rules a certificated repair station must follow as well as any person who holds, or is required to hold, a repair station certificate issued under this part.

== Public charter operations ==
Part 380 governs public charter operators. These companies arrange flights on certified airlines (Part 121 or 135) but then sell individual seats on those flights directly to the public. Unlike the airlines they partner with, Part 380 operators do not operate the aircraft themselves. Historically, this business model has been used by tour operators and casinos to offer occasional flights between smaller cities and popular leisure destinations. However, more recently, the Part 380 rules have also seen some creative applications.

In 2016, JSX began scheduling flights and selling tickets on flights operated by a Part 135 certificated airline (owned by the same parent company). This essentially allowed them to function as a scheduled air carrier (typically under Part 121 rules) while adhering to the less stringent Part 135 regulations. This enabled JSX to operate from fixed-base operator terminals, offering a more exclusive, private jet-like experience for their customers.

Other air carriers, including Advanced Air, Contour Airlines and Southern Airways Express, have also adopted similar strategies using Part 380. This approach allows them to offer more economical service to smaller cities participating in the Essential Air Service program, a government-backed initiative that subsidizes air service to underserved communities.

Several airlines and labor unions oppose these "creative" applications of Part 380, calling it a "loophole" that allows these companies to skirt the Part 121 rules that others must follow. As of 2024, the FAA is considering revisions to Part 380 regulations.

== See also ==
- Airspace
- Flight permits
- Day-night average sound level
- Joint Aviation Requirements
- National Security Area
- Night aviation regulations
- Prohibited airspace
- Restricted airspace
- Safety pilot
- Special flight rules area
- Special use airspace
- Transport category
