= Special flight rules area =

Airspace where flight regulations differ

In United States aviation, a special flight rules area (SFRA) is a region in which the normal regulations of flight do not apply in whole or in part, especially regulations concerning airspace classification, altitude, course, and speed restrictions, and the like.

== Washington, DC Special Flight Rules Area ==
Following the terrorist attacks of September 11, 2001, the airspace around Washington DC underwent a number of changes designed to restrict flying around the city. In 2003, a temporary flight rules area was created and was named the Washington DC Air Defense Identification Zone. In 2008 the temporary status of the ADIZ was removed and the rule was made permanent.

In order to fly within the DC SFRA, pilots of general aviation aircraft are required to file a special flight rules flight plan, obtain a discrete transponder code, and remain in contact with air traffic control at all times. Special training is required in order to fly within 60 nm of the Washington DC (KDCA) VOR.

== Los Angeles Special Flight Rules Area ==
Long established in the Los Angeles basin is the Los Angeles SFRA. Los Angeles International Airport is surrounded by extensive Class B airspace, which is difficult for VFR traffic to navigate. In particular, the airport has four large runways running east/west that have airspace protection from 10,000 feet (3050 metres) down to the surface that is 25 statute miles wide (40 kilometres). This large swath of Class B airspace bisects Los Angeles and makes flights between the airports north of LAX and south of LAX require air traffic control to route these flights. To alleviate this load on ATC, the SFRA over LAX defines two exceptions to the Class B airspace to allow VFR aircraft to transit without control from ATC.

There are two routes, one for southeast-bound traffic and one for northwest-bound traffic. Both follow the 132° radial of the Santa Monica VOR between the Santa Monica Airport and the intersection of Interstate 405 and Imperial Highway. Southeast-bound traffic flies at 3,500 feet (1050 metres). Northwest-bound traffic flies at 4,500 feet (1350 metres). Despite being in the Class B airspace, aircraft following the rules of this corridor need not communicate with ATC.

The rules are fairly simple: Turn on all practical lights, day or night. Squawk 1201. Do not exceed 140 knots IAS. Monitor and self-report on 128.55 MHz. Have a copy of the Los Angeles TAC in the aircraft. No jets.

== Hudson River Special Flight Rules Area ==
On November 19, 2009, the FAA effected an SFRA in the New York City Class B airspace, motivated largely by the mid-air collision of a private general aviation aircraft and a sightseeing helicopter ride along the Hudson River VFR corridor in the summer of 2009.

The Hudson River Class B exclusion area is formed from the airspace above the Hudson River between the Alpine Tower and the Verrazzano–Narrows Bridge. It is bounded by the banks of the Hudson River and runs from the surface of the river up to 1,300 feet (320 metres). Aircraft fly along the right-hand bank to separate northbound and southbound traffic. Aircraft transiting the entire corridor fly between 1,000' (350 metres) and 1,300' (400 metres). Aircraft performing local operations (mostly landing and taking off) inside the area fly under 1,000' (350 metres). Aircraft need not communicate with ATC, but they must make certain mandatory self-reports at certain charted points.

In addition, there is a further Class B exclusion area over the East River between the Hudson River and just past the Queensboro Bridge. This length cannot be transited, as the Queensboro end of the corridor ends inside the Class B airspace. Additionally, aircraft not landing or taking off inside the East River exclusion must be in contact with ATC.

== Other Examples ==
Other examples of SFRAs include:

- Grand Canyon
- Ketchikan, Alaska
- Valparaiso, Florida (community of Eglin Air Force Base)
- Within the Class C airspace of Anchorage International Airport and Elmendorf AFB
- Luke AFB
