= Aeronautical chart conventions (United States) =

This article describes the graphic conventions used in Sectional charts and Terminal area charts published for aeronautical navigation under Visual Flight Rules in the United States of America. The charts are published "in accordance with Interagency Air Cartographic Committee specifications and agreements, approved by the Department of Defense and the Federal Aviation Administration".

The legend of an aeronautical chart lists many of the symbols, colors and codes used to convey information to the map reader.

== General ==
A sectional chart is a two-sided chart created from a Lambert Conformal Conic Projection with two defined standard parallels. The scale is 1:500,000, with a contour interval of 500 feet. The size of each sectional is designed to be "arm's width" when completely unfolded. The "northern" half of the section is on one side of the chart, and the "southern" on the reverse. The edges between north and south are designed with a calibrated overlap that permits plotting extensions of course lines from one side to the other, once the user has scribed a corresponding "match line" on each side. All other edges are truncated at a predetermined size. White space around the chart is filled with map information and the legend, scales, and tables of airport and airspace information.

Terrain is color-coded for its elevation and major roads, cities, and bodies of water are shown for visual reference, as well as other identifiable structures (e.g., stadiums and water towers). However, most of the layers of data on the charts include specific information about obstacles, airspace designations, and facility information (locations, radio frequencies, etc.).

The legend divides these into several types of information, namely: airports, radio aids, traffic and airspace services, obstructions, topographic, and miscellaneous.

Other unusual features may be designated on the map with symbols that do not appear in the legend, such as areas where laser lights are routinely pointed into the air (a jagged-edged circle), or a wildlife protection area (a solid line with dots along the inside edge).

== Airports ==
The location of each airport and presence of control towers is indicated with a circle, or with an outline of the hard-surfaced runways (if over 8,069 feet long). Blue shows an airport with a control tower and magenta for others.

- Military airstrips (without hard-surface runways) are shown with two concentric circles.
- Private airports are shown with the letter "R" inside a circle.
- A heliport is designated with "H" in a circle.
- An unverified airstrip is shown with a "U" in a circle.
- An abandoned airport with paved runways is shown with a circle having an "X" over it.

== Airport data ==
Each indicated airport has an airport data block associated with it. The block may contain just the name, altitude and runway length, or any of the following additional information, among others.

- Part-time tower operation (a star symbol).
- FSS, ATIS/AWOS, CTAF indicators
- Control tower, ATIS, UNICOM frequencies, as available
- Right traffic pattern alert
- Special VFR restrictions
- Airport surveillance radar presence
- Lighting hour, if any
- Elevation in feet (typically at center of longest runway)
- Length of longest runway in hundreds of feet

== Radio aids and communication boxes ==
- Beacon locations, type, radio frequency, codes, and features are indicated
- Each VOR also includes a circular compass rose

== Airport traffic and airspace information ==
- Class B, C, D, E airspace is designated by colored lines of various types
- Elevations of floor or ceiling of some types of airspace are also indicated
- Location, name, and direction of Federal Airways are shown
- Special use airspace is shown using specific colors and markings
- Military Training Routes
- Terminal Radar Service areas
- National Security Areas
- Mode C areas

== Obstructions ==
Tall towers are especially dangerous and have specific markings according to their height above ground and whether or not lighted.

- Up to 1,000 feet above ground, a small, inverted "V" with a dot
- Towers 1,000 feet and over: the "V" is elongated.
- Groups of towers are shown with multiple symbols
- Towers with high-intensity lights are indicated by "lightning bolts" around the tip of the symbol.
- The elevation of the top of the obstacle is shown feet and depicted in both height above mean sea level and height above ground in parentheses.

== Topographic information ==
Based upon standard mapping symbols, these markings usually designate man-made structures that may be identifiable from the air, including:

- Major roadways, with or without showing route numbers (solid lines)
- Railroads, bridges, viaducts, dams (black lines, railroads with cross-hatching)
- Power transmission lines (may also be an obstacle in some areas) (solid lines between tower symbols)
- Aerial cables (dashed line between black boxes)
- Outdoor facilities such as stadiums, schools, golf courses, etc. (black box)
- Outdoor theaters, race tracks (funnel shape, oval shape)
- Water tank (black dot), lookout towers (circle with triangle inside), oil wells (empty circle), water wells (blue dot)
- Coast guard stations (diamond with "CG")

Where relevant, a mountain pass and its elevation may be shown with curved lines.

== Miscellaneous ==
Some indicators do not cleanly fall into the previous categories. These include:

- Isogonic lines, dashed magenta lines, indicating magnetic variation for a given year;
- Indications of flashing lights (star with Fl) or marine lights (black dot);
- Local operations such as parachuting, glider, and ultralight (magenta parachute or glider symbol with letter G, H (hang glider), U (ultralight));
- Preferred reporting points (magenta flag with name), on easily identified features; and
- VFR waypoints that are listed in the pertinent Airport/Facility Directory.
