= Strategic flood risk assessment =

In England and Wales, Strategic Flood Risk Assessments (SFRAs) are a required part of the local planning process, as set out in Planning Policy Statement 25, produced by the Department for Communities and Local Government. SFRAs are primarily produced by local planning authorities, in consultation with the Environment Agency, and are intended to "form the basis for preparing appropriate policies for flood risk management" at the local level.

At the regional level, the equivalent document is the Regional Flood Risk Appraisal.

On the smaller scale these SFRAs are used to inform site-specific Flood Risk Assessments (FRAs) for individual planning applications.
