= Restricted airspace =

Airspace with restrictions on traffic

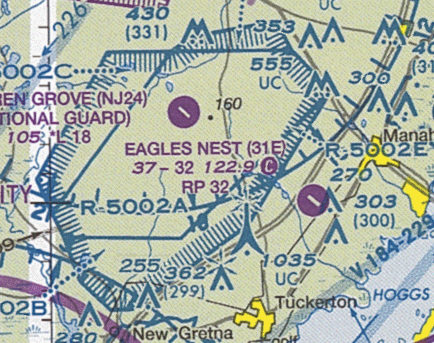
Section of the Sectional Aeronautical Chart for Washington 90th edition, showing the restricted area R-5002 around Warren Grove, New Jersey

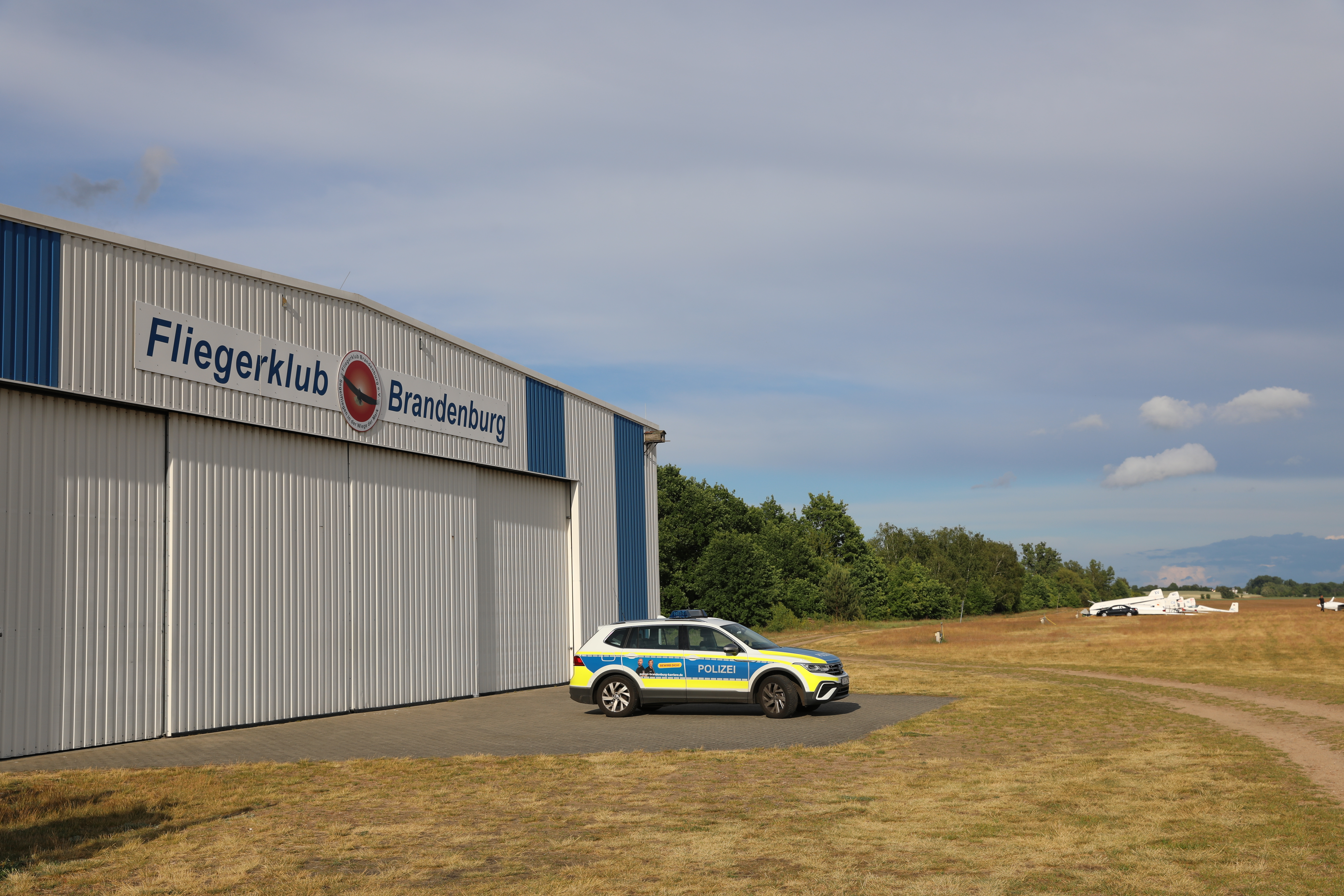
German police monitoring the "ED-R Humboldt" flight restriction area, which was set up for the state visit of Ukrainian President Zelenskyy to Berlin in May 2025

Restricted airspace is an area of airspace typically used by the military in which the local controlling authorities have determined that air traffic must be restricted or prohibited for safety or security concerns. It is one of many types of special use airspace designations and is depicted on aeronautical charts with the letter "R" followed by a serial number.

According to the United States Federal Aviation Administration (FAA): "Restricted areas denote the existence of unusual, often invisible, hazards to aircraft such as artillery firing, aerial gunnery, or guided missiles. Penetration of restricted areas without authorization from the using or controlling agency may be extremely hazardous to the aircraft and its occupants."

Restricted airspace zones may not be active ("hot") at all times; in such cases there are typically schedules of local dates and times available to aviators specifying when the zone is active, and at other times, the airspace is subject to normal VFR/IFR operation for the applicable airspace class. A few zones are activated by NOTAM; an example is R-2503D over Camp Pendleton in southern California, between San Diego and Los Angeles. This particular zone, beginning at 2000ft above sea level over most of southern Camp Pendleton, can be active only for a certain number of days per year, thus allowing small planes to fly a direct route between the two metro areas instead of being diverted offshore or into mountainous terrain further inland.

== See also ==
- Controlled airspace
- Prohibited airspace
- No-fly zone
