= Sweep frequency response analysis =

Sweep frequency response analysis (SFRA) is a method to evaluate the mechanical integrity of core, windings and clamping structures within power transformers by measuring their electrical transfer functions over a wide frequency range.

== Methods ==
SFRA is a comparative method, meaning an evaluation of the transformer condition is done by comparing an actual set of SFRA results to reference results. Three methods are commonly used to assess the measured traces:

- Time-based – current SFRA results will be compared to previous results of the same unit.
- Type-based – SFRA of one transformer will be compared to an equal type of transformer.
- Phase comparison – SFRA results of one phase will be compared to the results of the other phases of the same transformer.

== Process ==
Transformers generate a unique signature when tested at discrete frequencies and plotted as a curve. The distance between conductors of the transformer forms a capacitance. Any movement of the conductors or windings will change this capacitance. This capacitance being a part of complex L (inductance), R (Resistance) and C (Capacitance) network, any change in this capacitance will be reflected in the curve or signature.

An initial SFRA test is carried out to obtain the signature of the transformer frequency response by injecting various discreet frequencies. This reference is then used for future comparisons. A change in winding position, degradation in the insulation, etc. will result in change in capacitance or inductance thereby affecting the measured curves.

Tests are carried out periodically or during major external events like short circuits and results compared against the initial signature to test for any problems.

== Problem detection ==
SFRA analysis can detect problems in transformers such as:

- winding deformation – axial & radial, like hoop buckling, tilting, spiraling
- displacements between high and low voltage windings
- partial winding collapse
- shorted or open turns
- faulty grounding of core or screens
- core movement
- broken clamping structures
- problematic internal connections

== Uses ==
SFRA can be used in the following contexts:

- To obtain initial signature of healthy transformer for future comparisons
- Periodic checks as part of regular maintenance
- Immediately after a major external event like short circuit
- Transportation or relocation of transformer
- Studying earthquakes
- Pre-commissioning check
