= Controlled airspace =

Airspace served by air traffic control

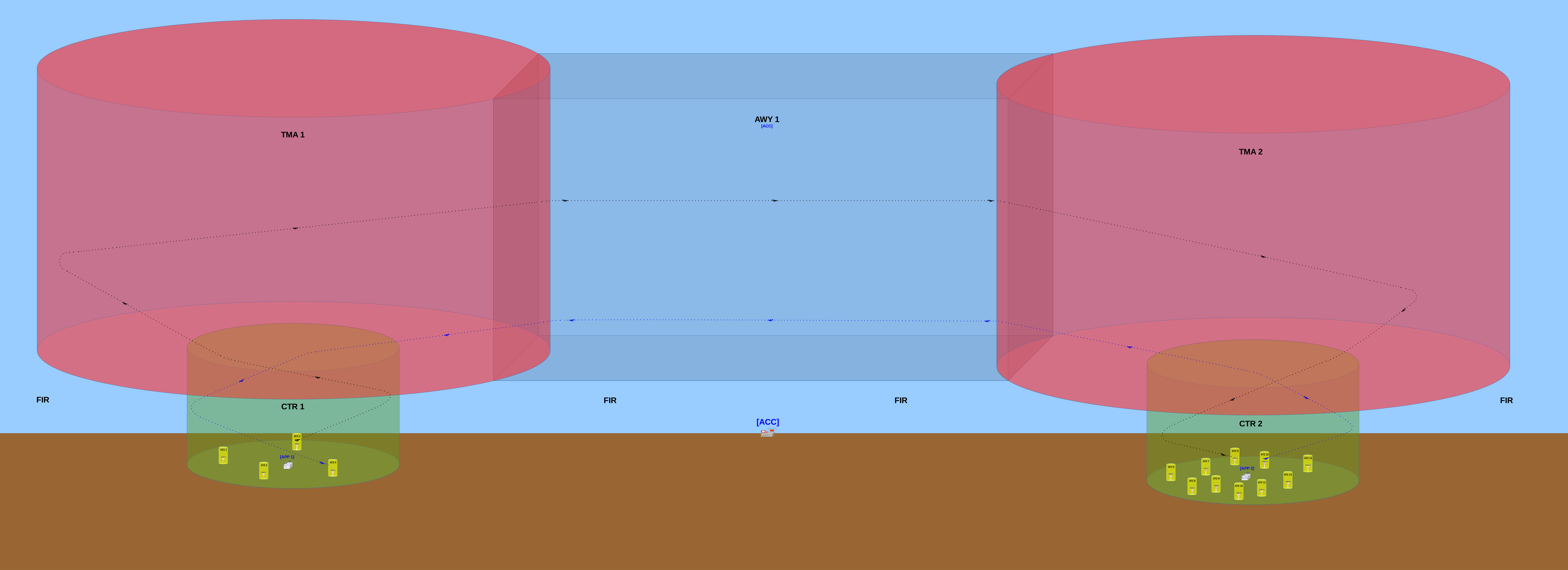
Schematic representation of the main controlled airspace types and the air traffic control offices that respectively provide control service inside these airspaces.

Controlled airspace is airspace of defined dimensions within which air traffic control (ATC) services are provided. The level of control varies with different classes of airspace. Controlled airspace usually imposes higher weather minimums than are applicable in uncontrolled airspace. It is the opposite of uncontrolled airspace.

== Classes ==
The International Civil Aviation Organization divides airspace into seven classes, from A to G, in order of decreasing ATC regulation of flights. Classes A to E are considered controlled airspace. Flight under instrument flight rules (IFR) is allowed in all controlled airspace, and flight under visual flight rules (VFR) is permitted in all airspace except class A.

Name	Permitted flight rules	Separation provided	Services provided	Radio required	Requires ATC clearance to enter
Class A	Only IFR	All aircraft are separated from all others	Air traffic control service to all flights	Yes	Yes
Class B	IFR and VFR	All aircraft are separated from all others	Air traffic control service to all flights	Yes	Yes
Class C	IFR and VFR	IFR flights separated from all others. VFR flights receive traffic information on IFR flights.	Air traffic control service to all flights	Yes	Yes
Class D	IFR and VFR	IFR flights separated from other IFR flights and receive traffic information on VFR flights. VFR flights receive traffic information on all other flights.	Air traffic control service to all flights	Yes	Yes
Class E	IFR and VFR	IFR flights separated from other IFR flights. All flights may receive traffic information when practical.	Air traffic control service to IFR flights, traffic information to VFR flights when practical	Yes	Yes for IFR, no for VFR

== Types ==
Certain special types of controlled airspace exist to protect aircraft in the vicinity of a busy airport.

=== Control Zone (CTR) ===
A control zone is a volume of controlled airspace, normally around an airport, which extends from the surface to a specified upper limit, established to protect air traffic operating to and from that airport. Because CTRs are by definition controlled airspace, aircraft can only fly in them after receiving a specific clearance from air traffic control. This means that air traffic control at the airport know exactly which aircraft are in that airspace, and can take steps to ensure aircraft are aware of each other, either using separation or by passing traffic information.

A CTR requires permanent radio contact while being in it, and a clearance before entering. Certain activities such as making an approach, landing and taking off also require clearances. This implies that an aircraft flying in it must be equipped with a radio. There are procedures for radio failures.

In the USA the term control zone is no longer used and has been replaced by airspace class D. Typically it extends 5 miles in diameter with a height of 2500 ft AGL (above ground level) around small commercial airports.

In the UK, control zones are normally class D airspace and usually extend from the surface to 2000 ft AGL. They can be observed to be usually rectangular, extending along the axis of the main runway, although irregular shapes may be used where more complex airspace dictates this (see Liverpool and East Midlands). A control area (CTA) is often placed between a CTR and nearby airways to give uninterrupted controlled airspace to airways arrivals and departures.

In Germany, control zones are a special type of class D airspace, called D (CTR). The main difference to the regular German class D airspace is, that within a CTR there is a minimum required cloud ceiling of 1500 ft AGL.

=== Control area (CTA) ===
A control area is a section of controlled airspace that extends upwards from a specified limit above the earth, which must be above 200m (700ft), and are established in areas where the density of traffic is high. The upper limit of a control area is either when an air traffic control service will not be provided above, or there is another control area above.

A control area usually is situated on top of a control zone (CTR) and provides protection to aircraft climbing out from the airport by joining the low-level control zone to the nearest airways. In the UK, they are generally class A, D or E.

A terminal control area (TMA) is a control area established surrounding one or major airports at the confluence of airways. It typically sits above each individual airport's CTR.

=== Terminal radar service area (TRSA) ===
In the United States, a terminal radar service area is a section of airspace surrounding a busy airport where optional air traffic control services are provided. It is designated as Class E airspace.

=== Aerodrome Traffic Zone (ATZ) ===
An aerodrome traffic zone is a small section of airspace defined around an aerodrome to protect the traffic departing or arriving. The dimensions vary. In the UK, it is typically defined as:

- Extending from the surface to 2000ft and with a radius of 2.5NM around the longest runway when the longest runway is longer than 1850m
- Extending from the surface to 2000ft and with a radius of 2.0NM around the longest runway when the longest runway is shorter than 1850m

== See also ==
- Airspace class
- Prohibited airspace
- Restricted airspace
- Special use airspace
- Terminal control area
