= Airspace =

Portion of the atmosphere controlled by a country

Flight information regions in France

Airspace is a portion of the atmosphere controlled by a country above its territory and territorial waters, which is under the country's sovereignty and regulatory control.

Internationally, allocation and management of airspace is coordinated by the International Civil Aviation Organization (ICAO), which was established through the 1944 Chicago Convention and came into being in 1947 to unify air traffic. ICAO organizes airspace into Flight Information Regions (FIRs) and provides classification guidelines. National authorities, such as the FAA, CAA, or EASA implement rules and regulations for air traffic control, special-use airspace, and enforcement within their own FIRs.

Airspace can be used for both civilian flight and for defense or military operations, and countries are responsible for protecting their own airspace using measures such as air policing. Legal and technical challenges include the vertical boundary between airspace and outer space and temporary restrictions such as NOTAMs or TFRs.

== Legal framework and ownership ==
On 4 April 1947, the International Civil Aviation Organization (ICAO) was established through the Chicago Convention, aimed at unifying and coordinating international air travel. ICAO provides regulations and guidance for countries concerning air navigation, its infrastructure, flight inspection, prevention of unlawful interference, and facilitation of border-crossing procedures for international civil aviation.

Sovereign airspace refers to airspace owned by a country. By law, a country has the right to airspace above its land and waters up to 12 miles from its coast (if present). Beyond 12 miles, airspace is considered international. ICAO divides airspace into Flight Information Regions (FIR), which are sections of airspace dedicated to a specific country. Within its own FIR(s), a country is responsible for providing air traffic control services and regulating flight. This is usually done using a national regulator, such as the FAA, CAA, or EASA, which are able to create their own regulations while still abiding by ICAO guidelines. Some countries may have multiple FIRs, for example, the United States has sole jurisdiction in 24 FIRs. A country may, by international agreement, assume responsibility for providing air traffic control services in parts of international airspace, which then becomes part of their FIR. Certain FIRs are dedicated oceanic sectors which support and control air traffic crossing large oceans such as the North Atlantic, which is made up of 7 FIRs controlled by countries like the UK, Ireland, and Canada.

There is no international agreement on the vertical extent of sovereign airspace, although most countries use the Kármán Line, 100km (62mi), as the legal distinction between airspace and outer space. However, descending Space Shuttles flew closer than 80 km (50 mi) over other nations, such as Canada, without requesting permission first.

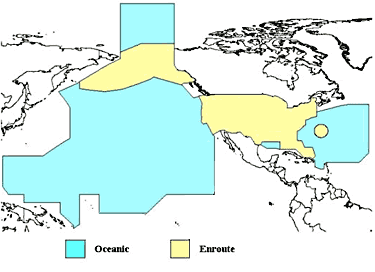
The Federal Aviation Administration (FAA) of the United States provides air traffic control services over U.S. territory and over international waters where it has been delegated such authority by the International Civil Aviation Organization. This map depicts overflight fee regions. The yellow regions are where the U.S. provides enroute ATC services (mostly over land territory). The blue regions are where the U.S. provides oceanic ATC services over international waters.

=== Private air rights ===
The boundary between public airspace and private air rights is defined by national or local law.

In the United States, the 1946 Supreme Court decision United States v. Causby overturned the common law doctrine that private property rights extend indefinitely upwards, instead ruling that they end 300 feet above the highest terrain (including buildings), the lower limit of the "public highway" defined by Congress in the Air Commerce Act of 1926. The Federal Aviation Administration regulates the construction and marking of structures taller than 200 feet near airports and 500 feet generally.

== Classification ==
Airspace is divided into classes, which dictate what services are provided in different areas. The classes are defined by ICAO, but countries are free to allocate different sections of airspace to different classes as they wish. There are 7 classes, A-G, with progressively less strict restrictions. This classification system was adopted by ICAO on 12 March 1990.

Class	Permitted flight rules	Controlled	Separation provided	Services provided	Radio required	Requires ATC clearance to enter
A	Only IFR	Yes	All aircraft are separated from all others	Air traffic control service to all flights	Yes	Yes
B	IFR and VFR	Yes	All aircraft are separated from all others	Air traffic control service to all flights	Yes	Yes
C	IFR and VFR	Yes	IFR flights separated from all others. VFR flights receive traffic information on IFR flights.	Air traffic control service to all flights	Yes	Yes
D	IFR and VFR	Yes	IFR flights separated from other IFR flights and receive traffic information on VFR flights. VFR flights receive traffic information on all other flights.	Air traffic control service to all flights	Yes	Yes
E	IFR and VFR	Yes	IFR flights separated from other IFR flights.	Air traffic control service to IFR flights, traffic information to all flights when practical	Yes	Yes for IFR, no for VFR
F	IFR and VFR	No	None provided	Participating IFR flights receive air traffic advisory service. Flight information service to all flights when practical (if available).	No	No
G	IFR and VFR	No	None provided	Flight information service to all flights when practical (if available).	No	No
Class F airspace is rarely used and is considered by ICAO to be a temporary measure before it can be replaced by an alternative classification. For example, the CAA previous classified certain routes where air traffic control only provided an advisory service as Class F, before they were later reclassified as class E in 2014 after an official review.
Source: Classification of Airspace, SKYbrary Aviation Safety

=== Controlled vs uncontrolled ===
==== Controlled airspace ====
United States implementation of ICAO airspace classification

Controlled airspace exists where it is deemed necessary that air traffic control has some form of positive executive control over aircraft flying in that airspace (however, air traffic control does not necessarily control traffic operating under visual flight rules (VFR) within this airspace). Controlled airspace consists of classes A-E. Special types of controlled airspace, such as Control Zones (CTR) and Aerodrome Traffic Zones (ATZ) exist to protect aircraft in the vicinity of an airport, typically when arriving or departing.

===== Uncontrolled airspace =====
Uncontrolled airspace is airspace in which an air traffic control (ATC) service is not deemed necessary or cannot be provided for practical reasons. Uncontrolled airspace consists of classes F and G. A flight information service may still be provided to participating aircraft in some areas, depending on practicality and availability.

=== Special use airspace ===
Special use airspace (SUA) is airspace designated for operations that may cause limitations on other, uninvolved aircraft and exist to allow countries to separate certain areas of airspace that could be dangerous to flights within them. SUA may be controlled or uncontrolled, and does not have any specific classes associated with it.

SUA includes:

- Prohibited airspace is an area where flight is prohibited, usually for safety reasons.
- Restricted airspace is an area where flight is restricted or subject to limitations, and may require permission to enter.

==== Temporary restrictions ====
Airspace may be temporarily restricted for safety. This may be via a NOTAM or temporary flight restriction (TFR) for a variety of reasons, such as protecting major sporting events, natural disaster areas, air shows, or VIP movements.

In the UK, airspace can be temporarily restricted by using a prohibited area, restricted area, or danger area—which designates areas where dangerous activities to flight may be taking place.

== Defense ==
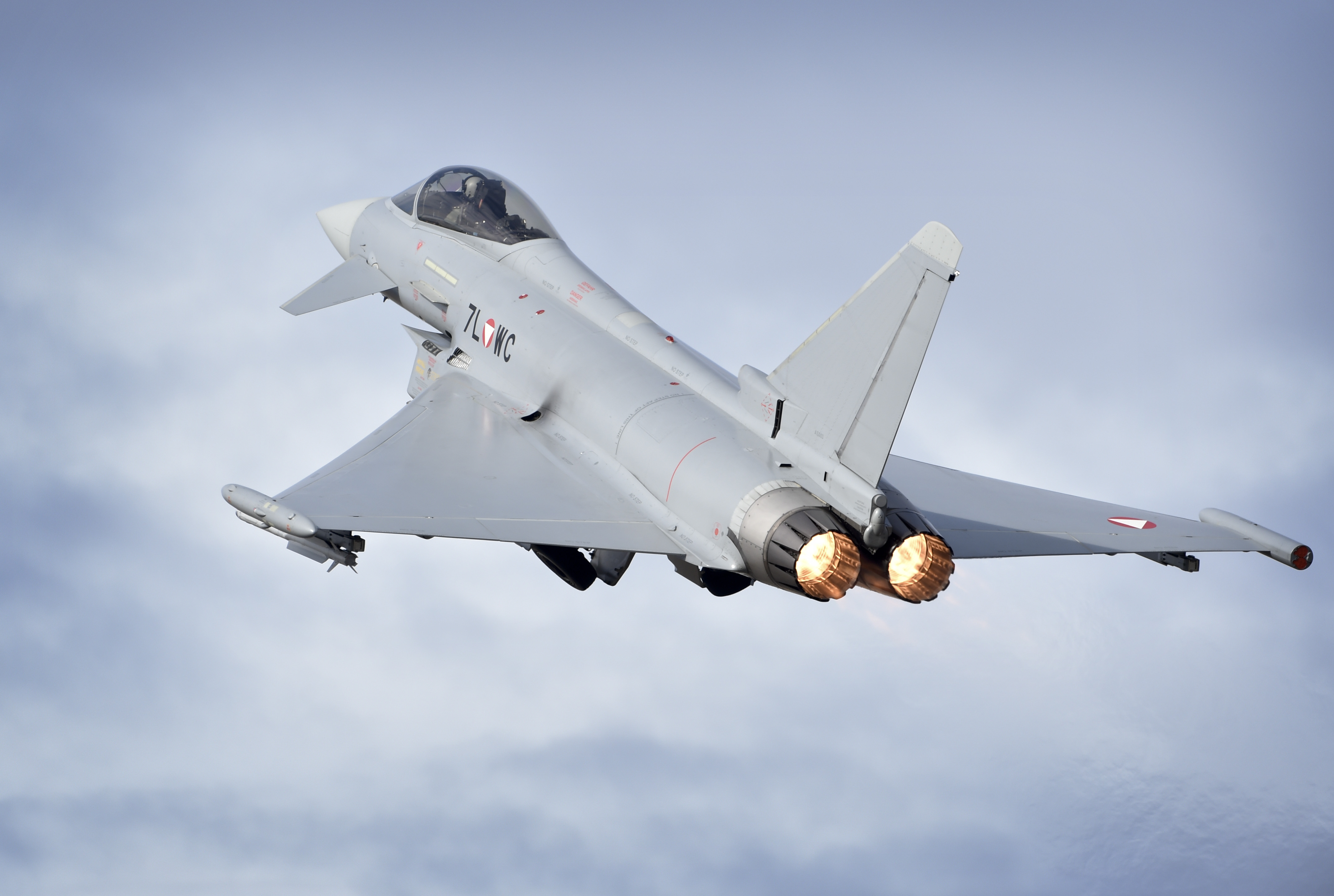
A Eurofighter Typhoon on QRA takes off to conduct training intercepting a passenger aircraft.

In countries with an established military, airspace is usually defended to protect national sovereignty. While military flights have to share airspace with civilians, they may use military training routes or other special use airspace to protect civilian flights from dangerous activities.

=== NATO Air policing ===
NATO conducts air policing missions to protect sovereign European airspace from both enemy military aircraft and civilian aircraft that fail to identify themselves, fail to communicate with air traffic control, or don't follow a flight plan. They do this by keeping fighter aircraft in a 24/7 state of quick reaction alert, ready to be scrambled at any time.

For example, the Royal Air Force maintains four Eurofighter Typhoons at 24/7 readiness: two at RAF Coningsby and two at RAF Lossiemouth. Some NATO states do not have the capability to conduct QRA over their own territory, such as in the Baltic and Icelandic areas, so other NATO countries provide aircraft to cover instead. In the United States, the quick reaction alert mission is referred to as Aerospace Control Alert, after having been renamed from Air Sovereignty Alert in 2011. The majority of aerospace control alert missions in the U.S. are carried out by the Air National Guard using the F-15 Eagle and F-16 Fighting Falcon jets.

=== Air defense identification zones (ADIZ) ===
An air defense identification zone is a region of airspace where a country identifies, locates, and controls aircraft to protect national security, which, in many cases, can cover airspace outside of the country's sovereign airspace. A country may impose limitations on aircraft within them, such as requiring a flight plan to be filed.

In 2013, China established an ADIZ in the East China Sea, drawing criticisms from neighbouring countries and the United States, as it overlaps existing zones and imposes requirements on both civilian and military aircraft. Since 2010, China has been planning to establish an ADIZ over the South China Sea, which would raise tensions in the existing territorial disputes. However, as of 2025, no ADIZ has been created.

Russian aircraft are frequently tracked by the United States entering their Alaska ADIZ, often triggering QRA responses of American fighters.

=== Violations and incidents ===
An airspace violation occurs when an aircraft enters controlled or national airspace without authorisation. Such incidents may be accidental, such as navigation or communication errors, or they may be deliberate, such as military reconnaissance or probing.

In the Cold War, aircraft such as Korean Air Lines Flight 007 were shot down due to misidentification as enemy military aircraft. In 2023, a Chinese high altitude balloon entered US airspace, allegedly for intelligence gathering, and was subsequently shot down by an American jet, increasing tensions between the two countries. In August and September 2025, Russia repeatedly flew drones and aircraft into NATO airspace, prompting NATO to launch Operation Eastern Sentry after an Article 4 declaration.

== Modernization ==
=== Performance-based navigation ===
Performance-based navigation (PBN) is a type of navigation that allows aircraft to use GPS and other satellite navigation instead of only ground-based stations like VORs which improves airspace safety, capacity, and efficiency. ICAO and national authorities such as the FAA are gradually redesigning controlled and uncontrolled airspace to support Required Navigation Performance (RNP) and Area Navigation (RNAV) routes. This changes allow for more efficient flight paths and reduce the need of maintaining specific physical sensors. Projects led by service providers such as Hughes Aerospace have demonstrated how PBN procedures can be used to optimize traffic flows and reduce noise in congested areas, such as the Naples Municipal Airport in Florida.

== See also ==
- Index of aviation articles
- Flyover rights
- Space law
- International Civil Aviation Organization
- Air traffic control
