= Aeronautical chart =

Map designed to assist in navigation of aircraft

An aeronautical chart is a map designed to assist in the navigation of aircraft, much as nautical charts do for watercraft, or a roadmap does for drivers. Using these charts and other tools, pilots are able to determine their position, safe altitude, best route to a destination, navigation aids along the way, alternative landing areas in case of an in-flight emergency, and other useful information such as radio frequencies and airspace boundaries. There are charts for all land masses on Earth, and long-distance charts for trans-oceanic travel.

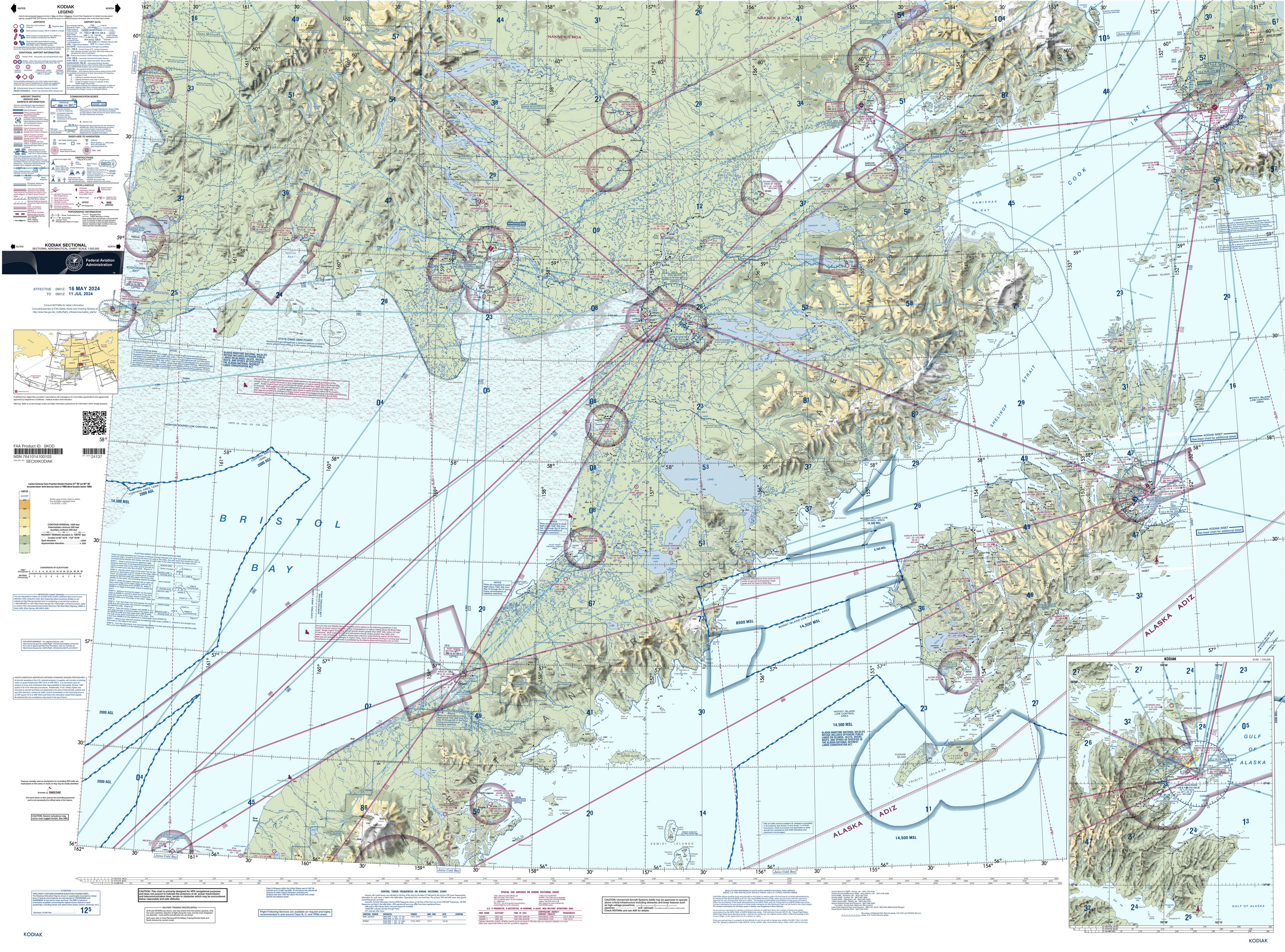
Example of an aeronautical chart (VFR) (FAA), 2024

Specific charts are used for each phase of a flight and may vary from a map of a particular airport facility to an overview of the instrument routes covering an entire continent (e.g., global navigation charts), and many types in between.

Visual flight charts are categorized according to their scale, which is proportional to the size of the area covered by one map. The amount of detail is necessarily reduced when larger areas are represented on a map.

- World aeronautical charts (WACs) have a scale of 1:1,000,000 and cover relatively large areas. Outside of WAC coverage, operational navigation charts (ONC) may be used. They use the same scale as WACs, but omit some useful information such as airspace restrictions.
- Sectional charts typically cover a total area of about 340x340 miles, printed on both sides of the map. The scale is 1:500,000.
- VFR terminal area charts are created with a scale and coverage appropriate for the general vicinity of a large airport (1:250,000). They may depict preferred VFR flight routes within areas of congested airspace.

== Use under instrument flight rules ==
When an aircraft is flying under instrument flight rules (IFR), the pilot will often have no visual reference to the ground, and must therefore rely on external (e.g. GPS or VOR) aids in order to navigate. Although in some situations air traffic control may issue radar vectors to direct an aircraft's path, this is usually done to facilitate traffic flow, and will not be the sole means of navigating to an important point, such as the position from which an aircraft commences its approach to landing.

Charts used for IFR flights contain an abundance of information regarding locations of waypoints, known as "fixes", which are defined by measurements from electronic beacons of various types, as well as the routes connecting these waypoints. Only limited topographic information is found on IFR charts, although the minimum safe altitudes available on the routes are shown.

En-route low- and high-altitude charts are published with a scale that depends upon the density of navigation information required in the vicinity.

Information from IFR charts is often programmed into a flight management system or autopilot, which eases the task of following (or deviating from) a flight plan.

Terminal procedure publications such as standard terminal arrival plates, standard instrument departure plates and other documentation provide detailed information for arrival, departure and taxiing at each approved airport having instrument capabilities of some sort.

== Sources for charts ==
Aeronautical charts may be purchased at fixed-base operators (FBOs), internet supply sources, or catalogs of aeronautical gear. They may also be viewed online from the Federal Aviation Administration.

== See also ==
- Index of aviation articles
- Moving map display
- Nautical chart
- World aeronautical chart
- Sectional chart
- Terminal area chart
- En-route chart
- Standard terminal arrival
- Standard instrument departure
- Global positioning system
- Flight management system
- Electronic flight bag
- Spherical trigonometry
