= Moving map display =

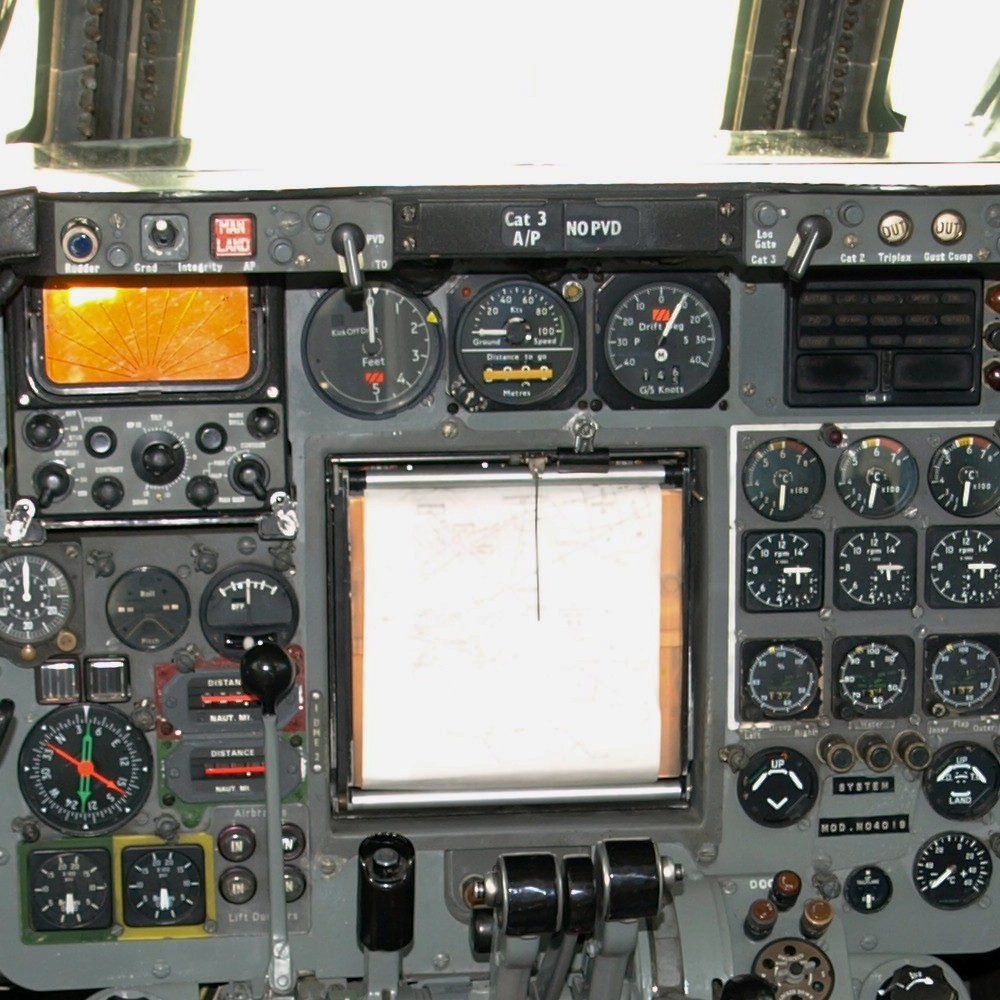
The mechanical moving map display of a HS Trident early jetliner

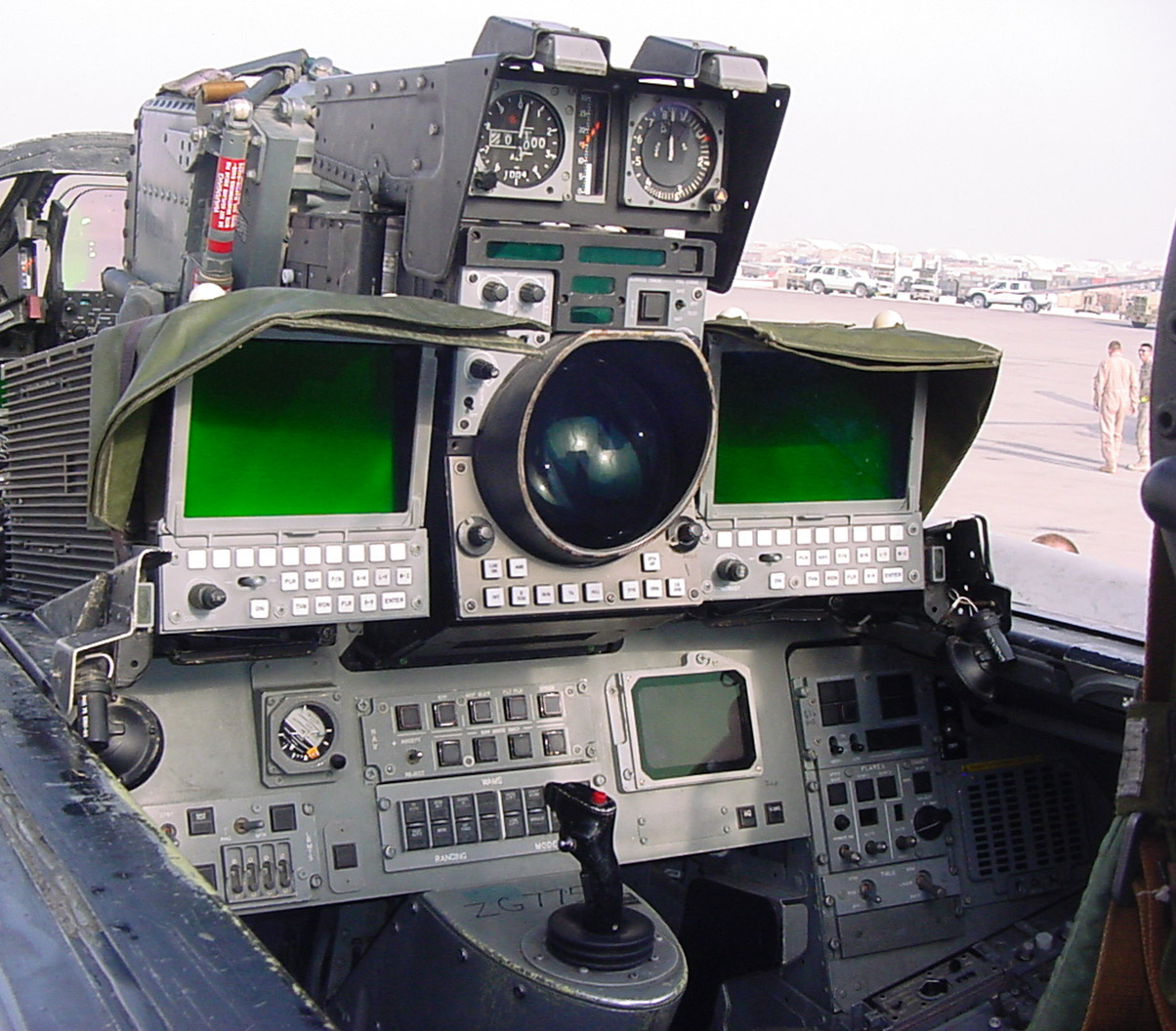
Combined Radar and Projected Map Display (CRPMD), centre, navigator cockpit, Tornado GR.4

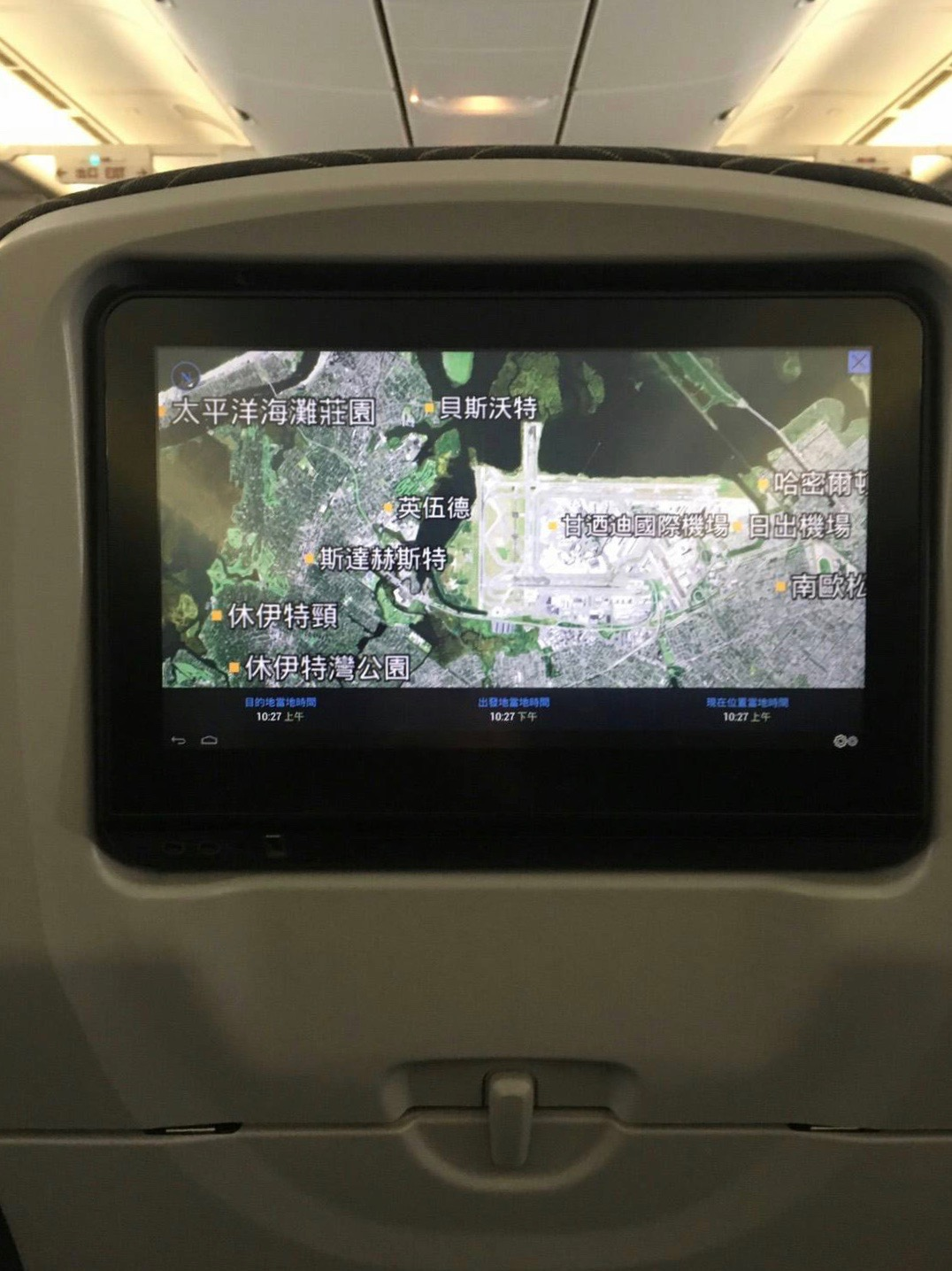
Moving map display on PTV screen

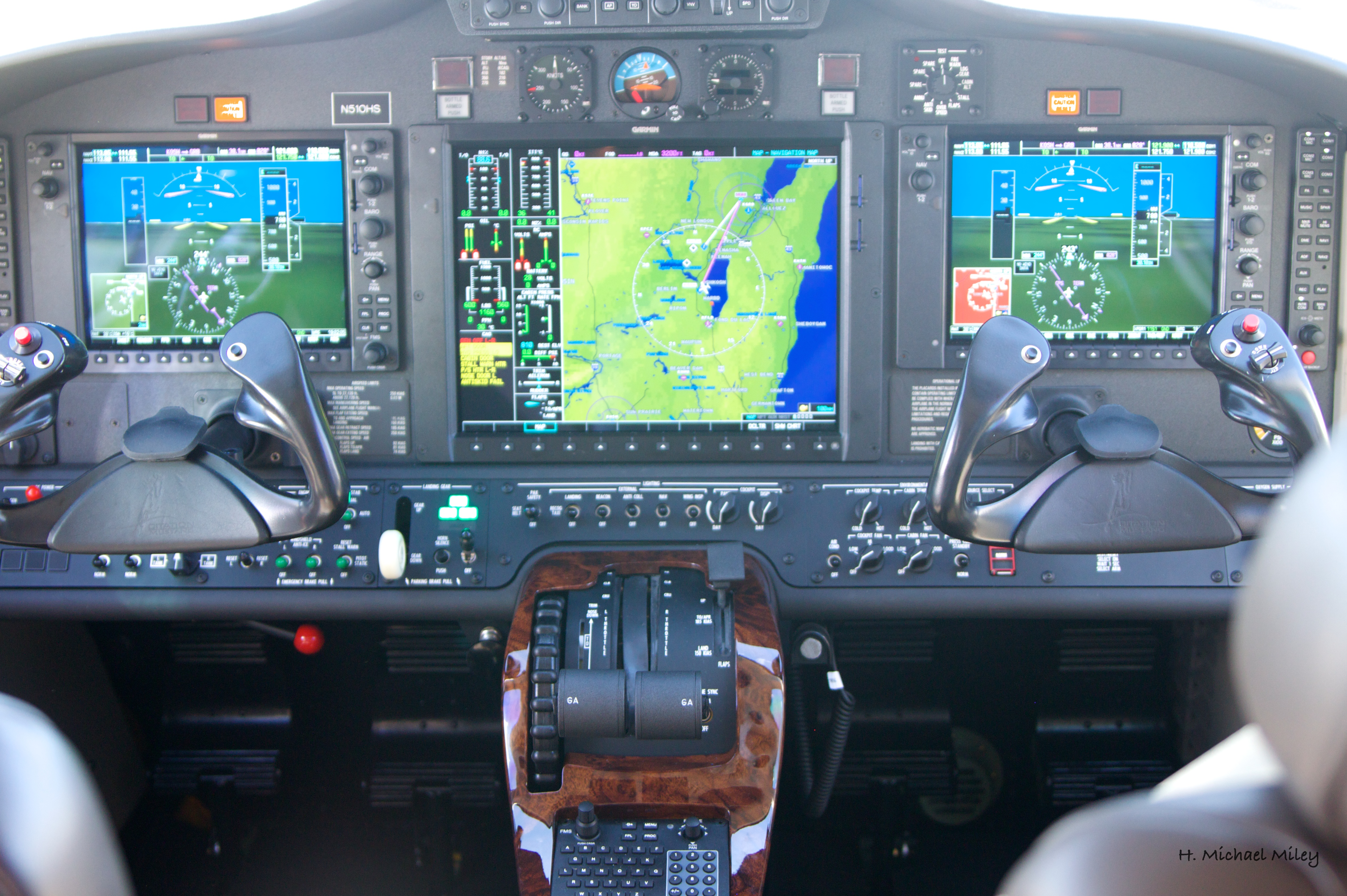
Digital moving map display, centre, in an aircraft cockpit

A moving map display (MMD) / projected map display (PMD) is a type of navigation system output that, instead of numerically displaying the current geographical coordinates determined by the navigation unit or an heading and distance indication of a certain waypoint, displays the unit's current location at the center of a map. As the unit moves around and new coordinates are therefore determined, the map moves to keep its position at the center of the display.

Mechanical moving map displays using paper charts were first introduced in the 1950s, and became common in some roles during the 1960s. Mechanically moved paper maps were replaced by projected map displays and digital maps during the 1970s and 80s, with resolution and detail improving along with computer imagery and the computer memory systems that held the data.

A symbol representing the location of the GPS device carried by a person or inside a vehicle, remains stationary on the display screen while a map or chart image moves beneath the symbol. The display thus portrays the physical movement of the device on the displayed map or chart. The portrayal typically shows a simulated overhead view of the device location on the moving map, but some devices also simulate a three-dimensional view from the perspective of the device. Many devices also provide an option for the map or chart image to remain stationary on the display while the location symbol moves to represent physical device movement. Some moving map display systems also provide a method of displaying the elevation of the device above sea level or the earth's surface.

A common example of a moving map display today is the map display on a smart phone or tablet screen, with an app using GPS to determine the device's current position and display it on map data from the device's internal storage or from the Internet in real time. This use of phones and tablets has expanded very rapidly for navigation in car travel, hiking, and aviation. Moving map applications are now included in the base software for most phones and tablets, and include many helpful options like directions to destination, business hours, and more.

Aviation moving map apps include extensive in-flight information such as other nearby aircraft. Weather and other data is also available and may be depicted on the moving map. Some sophisticated apps, even including 3D display options for this purpose are available free, without subscription fees. This trend has enabled even inexpensive aircraft with no electrical system to have very advanced avionics in flight. Many pilots of the most expensive jets and helicopters also use such apps to supplement expensive certified avionics.

== See also ==
- GPS navigation device
- In-flight entertainment, Moving-map systems
- Fresnel lens
- Microform
