= Special use airspace =

Airspace designated for specific use cases

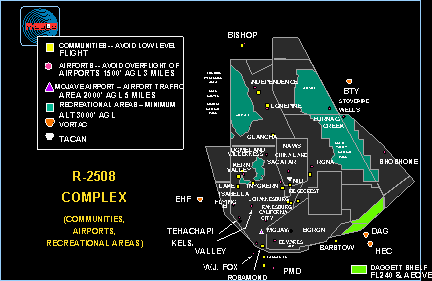
Map of special use airspace R2508 in the Mojave Desert

Special use airspace (SUA) is airspace designated for operations that may cause limitations on other, uninvolved aircraft. These operations are often military. Designating these sections of airspace helps inform pilots about the potential hazards so that they can be easily avoided.

Most SUAs are depicted on aeronautical charts and, in the United States, listed on FAA websites.

The International Civil Aviation Organization defines SUAs as Flexible Use of Airspace (FUA), an airspace management concept where airspaces should never be designated as purely civil or military, but rather as a continuum in which all user demands are accommodated to the greatest possible extent.

== Types ==
Special use airspace includes:

=== Prohibited Airspace ===
Prohibited airspace are areas where flight is not permitted, unless a clearance is issued by ATC or a relevant agency, usually for security reasons.

=== Restricted Airspace ===
Restricted airspace are areas where potentially invisible and extreme dangers towards aircraft will be present, causing flight to be restricted or limited. In the UK, temporary restricted airspace can be created for large events, contests, or national security purposes.

== In the United States ==
In the United States, a few types of SUAs exist:

- Military Training Routes (MTR) are aerial corridors in which military aircraft can operate below 10,000 feet faster than the maximum safe speed of 250 knots that all other aircraft are restricted to while operating below 10,000 feet. The routes are the result of a joint venture between the Federal Aviation Administration and the Department of Defense to provide for high-speed, low-altitude military activities.
- Controlled Firing Areas (CFA) contain activities that may be hazardous to nonparticipating aircraft, but ceased immediately when spotter aircraft, radar, or ground lookout positions indicate an aircraft might be approaching the area. They are not depicted on charts.
- National Security Areas (NSA) are sections of airspace through which flight is discouraged for reasons of national security. Aircraft are strongly advised to remain clear, or to request permission from the appropriate agency, though this is not necessary.
- Alert Areas are sections of airspace where a high volume pilot training or otherwise unusual aerial activity is taking place. They're used to advise pilots when to be particularly alert.
