= List of flight information regions and area control centers =

This is a list of flight information regions (FIRs) and the area control centers (ACCs) that control them.

ICAO code	FIR	ACC	Type	Country or territory
AGGG	Honiara	Honiara ACC		Solomon Islands
ANAU	Nauru	Nauru ACC		Nauru
AYPM	Port Moresby	Port Moresby ACC		Papua New Guinea
BGGL	Nuuk	Nuuk ACC		Greenland (Denmark)
BIRD	Reykjavík	Reykjavík ACC		Iceland/Faroe Islands (Denmark)
CZEG	Edmonton	Edmonton ACC		Canada
CZQM	Moncton	Moncton ACC		Canada
CZQX	Gander	Gander ACC		Canada/Saint Pierre and Miquelon (France)
CZQX	Gander Oceanic	Gander ACC	Oceanic	Canada
CZUL	Montreal	Montreal ACC		Canada
CZVR	Vancouver	Vancouver ACC		Canada
CZWG	Winnipeg	Winnipeg ACC		Canada
CZYZ	Toronto	Toronto ACC		Canada
DAAA	Alger	Alger ACC		Algeria
DGAC	Accra	Accra ACC		Benin/Ghana/Togo
DNKK	Kano	Kano ACC		Nigeria
DRRR	Niamey	Niamey ACC		Benin/Burkina Faso/Mali/Niger
DTTC	Tunis	Tunis ACC		Tunisia
EBBU	Brussels	Brussels ACC		Belgium/Luxembourg
EDGG	Langen	Langen ACC		Germany
EDMM	München	Munich ACC		Germany
EDUU	Rhein UIR	Rhein (Karlsruhe) UAC	UIR	Germany
EDVV	Hannover	Hannover UAC	UIR	Germany
EDWW	Bremen	Bremen ACC		Germany
EDYY	IFPZ (Eurocontrol)	Maastricht ACC	UIR	Belgium/Germany/Luxembourg/Netherlands
EETT	Tallinn	Tallinn ACC		Estonia
EFIN	Finland	Helsinki ACC		Finland/Åland Islands
EGGX	Shanwick Oceanic	Shanwick Oceanic ACC	Oceanic	United Kingdom/Ireland
EGPX	Scottish	Scottish (Prestwick) ACC		United Kingdom
EGQQ	Scottish	Scottish ACC (Mil)	Military	United Kingdom
EGTT	London	London ACC		United Kingdom/Isle of Man
EHAA	Amsterdam	Amsterdam ACC		Netherlands
EISN	Shannon	Shannon ACC		Ireland
EKDK	København	Copenhagen ACC		Denmark
ENOB	Bodo	Bodø ATCC	Oceanic	Norway
ENOR	Polaris	Bodø ACC; Oslo ACC; Stavanger ACC		Norway
EPWW	Warsawa	Warszawa ACC		Poland
ESAA	Sweden	Malmö ACC; Stockholm ACC		Sweden
EVRR	Riga	Riga ACC		Latvia
EYVL	Vilnius	Vilnius ACC		Lithuania
FACA	Capetown	Cape Town ACC		South Africa
FAJA	Johannesburg	Johannesburg ACC		Lesotho/South Africa/Eswatini
FAJO	Johannesburg Oceanic	Johannesburg Oceanic ACC	Oceanic	South Africa/Antarctica between 10°W and 75°E
FBGR	Gaborone	Gaborone ACC		Botswana
FCCC	Brazzaville	Brazzaville ACC		Cameroon/Central African Republic/Congo/Equatorial Guinea/Gabon/Sao Tome and Principe
FIMM	Mauritius	Mauritius (Plaine Magnien) ACC		Mauritius/British Indian Ocean Territory (United Kingdom)
FLFI	Zambia	Lusaka ACC		Zambia
FMMM	Antananarivo	Antananarivo ACC		Madagascar/Comoros/Réunion (France)
FNAN	Luanda	Luanda ACC		Angola/Saint Helena (United Kingdom)
FQBE	Beira	Beira ACC		Mozambique
FSSS	Seychelles	Seychelles (Victoria) ACC		Seychelles
FTTT	N'Djamena	N'Djamena ACC		Cameroon/Central African Republic/Chad
FVHF	Harare	Harare ACC		Zimbabwe
FWLL	Lilongwe	Lilongwe ACC		Malawi
FYWF	Windhoek	Windhoek ACC		Namibia
FZZA	Kinshasa	Kinshasa ACC		Congo, Democratic Republic of the
GCCC	Canarias	Canarias ACC		Canary Islands (Spain)/Western Sahara
GLRB	Roberts	Roberts ACC		Guinea/Liberia/Sierra Leone
GMMM	Casablanca	Casablanca ACC		Morocco
GOOO	Dakar	Dakar ACC	Oceanic	Ivory Coast/Gambia/Mali/Mauritania/Senegal
GVSC	Sal Oceanic	Sal Oceanic ACC	Oceanic	Cape Verde
HAAA	Addis Ababa	Addis Ababa ACC		Ethiopia
HBBA	Bujumbura	Bujumbura ACC		Burundi
HCSM	Mogadishu	Mogadishu ACC		Somalia
HECC	Cairo	Cairo ACC		Egypt
HHAA	Asmara	Asmara ACC		Eritrea
HJJJ	Juba	Juba ACC		South Sudan
HKNA	Nairobi	Nairobi ACC		Kenya
HLLL	Tripoli	Tripoli ACC		Libya
HRYR	Kigali	Kigali ACC		Rwanda
HSSS	Khartoum	Khartoum ACC		Sudan
HTDC	Dar es-Salaam	Dar es Salaam ACC		Tanzania
HUEC	Entebbe	Entebbe ACC		Uganda
IFPS	IFPZ (Eurocontrol)	Eurocontrol	Eurocontrol	European Union
KZAB	Albuquerque	Albuquerque ARTCC		United States
KZAK	Oakland Oceanic	Oakland ARTCC	Oceanic	Guam/Micronesia/Marshall Islands/Northern Mariana Islands/Palau/United States
KZAU	Chicago	Chicago ARTCC		United States
KZBW	Boston	Boston ARTCC		United States
KZDC	Washington	Washington ARTCC		United States
KZDV	Denver	Denver ARTCC		United States
KZFW	Fort Worth	Fort Worth ARTCC		United States
KZHU	Houston	Houston ARTCC		United States
KZHU	Houston Oceanic	Houston ARTCC	Oceanic	United States
KZID	Indianapolis	Indianapolis ARTCC		United States
KZJX	Jacksonville	Jacksonville ARTCC		United States
KZKC	Kansas City	Kansas City ARTCC		United States
KZLA	Los Angeles	Los Angeles ARTCC		United States
KZLC	Salt Lake	Salt Lake ARTCC		United States
KZMA	Miami	Miami ARTCC		United States
KZMA	Miami Oceanic	Miami ARTCC	Oceanic	United States/Turks and Caicos (United Kingdom)
KZME	Memphis	Memphis ARTCC		United States
KZMP	Minneapolis	Minneapolis ARTCC		United States
KZNY	New York	New York ARTCC		United States
KZOA	Oakland (En route)	Oakland ARTCC		United States
KZOB	Cleveland	Cleveland ARTCC		United States
KZSE	Seattle	Seattle ARTCC		United States
KZTL	Atlanta	Atlanta ARTCC		United States
KZWY	New York Oceanic	New York ARTCC	Oceanic	Bermuda (United Kingdom)/United States
LAAA	Tirana	Tirana ACC		Albania
LBSR	Sofia	Sofia ACC		Bulgaria
LCCC	Nicosia	Nicosia ACC		Cyprus
LDZO	Zagreb	Zagreb ACC		Croatia
LECB	Barcelona	Barcelona ACC		Spain
LECM	Madrid	Madrid ACC; Sevilla ACC		Spain/Gibraltar (United Kingdom)
LFBB	Bordeaux	Bordeaux ACC		France
LFEE	Reims	Reims ACC		France
LFFF	Paris	Paris ACC	FIR/UIR	France
LFMM	Marseille	Marseille ACC		France
LFRR	Brest	Brest ACC		France/Guernsey/Jersey
LGGG	Athens	Athens ACC		Greece
LHCC	Budapest	Budapest ACC		Hungary
LIBB	Brindisi	Brindisi ACC		Italy
LIMM	Milano	Milano ACC; Padova ACC		Italy/San Marino
LIRR	Roma	Roma ACC		Italy
LJLA	Ljubljana	Ljubljana ACC		Slovenia
LKAA	Praha	Praha ACC		Czech Republic
LLLL	Tel-Aviv	Tel-Aviv ACC		Israel
LMMM	Malta	Malta ACC		Malta
LOVV	Wien	Wien ACC		Austria
LPPC	Lisboa	Lisboa ACC		Portugal
LPPO	Santa Maria	Santa Maria OAC	Oceanic	Azores (Portugal)
LQSB	Sarajevo	Sarajevo ACC		Bosnia and Herzegovina
LRBB	Bucureşti	Bucuresti ACC		Romania
LSAS	Switzerland	Geneva ACC; Zurich ACC		Switzerland
LTAA	Ankara	Ankara ACC		Turkey
LTBB	Istanbul	Istanbul ACC		Turkey
LUUU	Chisinau	Chisinau ACC		Moldova
LWSS	Skopje	Skopje ACC		North Macedonia
LYBA	Beograd	Beograd ACC		Serbia
LZBB	Bratislava	Bratislava ACC		Slovakia
MDCS	Santo Domingo	Santo Domingo ACC		Dominican Republic
MHCC	Central American	CENAMER (Tegucigalpa) ACC		Belize/Costa Rica/El Salvador/Guatemala/Honduras/Nicaragua
MKJK	Kingston	Kingston ACC		Jamaica/Cayman Islands (United Kingdom)
MMEX	Mexico	Mexico ACC		Mexico
MMFO	Mazatlan Oceanic	Mazatlan Oceanic ACC	Oceanic	Mexico
MMID	Merida	Merida ACC		Mexico
MMTY	Monterey	Monterey ACC		Mexico
MMZT	Mazatlan	Mazatlan ACC		Mexico
MPZL	Panama	Panama ACC		Panama
MTEG	Port-au-Prince	Port-au-Prince ACC		Haiti
MUFH	Habana	Habana ACC		Cuba
MYNA	Nassau	Nassau ACC		Bahamas
NFFF	Nadi	Nadi ACC		Fiji/Kiribati/New Caledonia (France)/Tuvalu/Vanuatu
NTTT	Tahiti	Tahiti ACC		French Polynesia (France)
NZZC	New Zealand	Christchurch ACC		New Zealand
NZZO	Auckland Oceanic	Auckland OAC	Oceanic	New Zealand/Cook Islands/Niue/Samoa/Tokelau/Tonga/Antarctica between 163°E and 131°W
OAKX	Kabul	Kabul ACC		Afghanistan
OBBB	Bahrain	Bahrain ACC		Bahrain
OEJD	Jeddah	Jeddah ACC		Saudi Arabia
OIIX	Tehran	Tehran ACC		Iran
OJAC	Amman	Amman ACC		Jordan
OKAC	Kuwait	Kuwait ACC		Kuwait
OLBB	Beirut	Beirut ACC		Lebanon
OMAE	Emirates	Emirates (Abu Dhabi) ACC		United Arab Emirates
OOMM	Muscat	Muscat ACC		Oman
OPKR	Karachi	Karachi ACC		Pakistan
OPLR	Lahore	Lahore ACC		Pakistan
ORBB	Baghdad	Baghdad ACC		Iraq
OSTT	Damascus	Damascus ACC		Syria
OTDF	Doha	Doha ACC		Qatar
OYSC	Sanaa	Sanaa ACC		Yemen
PAZA	Anchorage Continental	Anchorage ARTCC		United States
PAZN	Anchorage Oceanic	Anchorage ARTCC	Oceanic	United States
PHZH	Honolulu	Honolulu ACC		United States
RCAA	Taibei	Taipei ACC		Taiwan
RJJJ	Fukuoka	Air Traffic Management Center; Fukuoka ACC; Kobe ACC; Sapporo ACC; Tokyo ACC		Japan
RKRR	Incheon	Incheon ACC		South Korea
RPHI	Manila	Manila ACC		Philippines
SACF	Cordoba	Cordoba ACC		Argentina
SAEF	Ezeiza	Ezeiza ACC		Argentina
SAMF	Mendoza	Mendoza ACC		Argentina
SARR	Resistencia	Resistencia ACC		Argentina
SAVF	Comodoro Rivadavia	Comodoro Rivadavia ACC		Argentina/Antarctica between 53°W and 10°W
SBAO	Atlantico	Atlantico ACC		Brazil/Ascension Island (United Kingdom)
SBAZ	Amazonica	Amazonica (Manaus) ACC		Brazil
SBBS	Brasilia	Brasilia ACC		Brazil
SBCW	Curitiba	Curitiba ACC		Brazil
SBRE	Recife	Recife ACC		Brazil
SCCZ	Punta Arenas	Punta Arenas ACC		Chile/Antarctica between 90°W and 53°W
SCEZ	Santiago	Santiago ACC		Chile
SCFZ	Antofagasta	Antofagasta ACC		Chile
SCIZ	Easter Island	Easter Island ACC		Easter Island (Chile)/Antarctica between 131°W and 90°W
SCTZ	Puerto Montt	Puerto Montt ACC		Chile
SEFG	Guayaquil	Guayaquil ACC		Ecuador
SGFA	Asuncion	Asuncion ACC		Paraguay
SKEC	Barranquilla	Barranquilla ACC		Colombia
SKED	Bogota	Bogota ACC		Colombia
SLLF	La Paz	La Paz ACC		Bolivia
SMPM	Paramaribo	Paramaribo ACC		Suriname
SOOO	Rochambeau	Rochambeau ACC		French Guiana (France)
SPIM	Lima	Lima ACC		Peru
SUEO	Montevideo	Montevideo ACC		Uruguay
SVZM	Maiquetia	Maiquetia ACC		Venezuela
SYGC	Georgetown	Georgetown ACC		Guyana
TJZS	San Juan	San Juan ACC		Anguilla (United Kingdom)/British Virgin Islands (United Kingdom)/Puerto Rico (United States)/Saint Barthélemy (France)/Sint Maarten (Netherlands)
TNCF	Curaçao	Curaçao ACC		Aruba/Curaçao (Netherlands)/Bonaire (Netherlands)
TTZP	Piarco	Piarco ACC		Antigua and Barbuda/Barbados/Dominica/Grenada/Guadeloupe (France)/Martinique (France)/Montserrat (United Kingdom)/Saint Kitts and Nevis/Saint Lucia/Saint Vincent and the Grenadines/Trinidad and Tobago
UAAA	Almaty	Almaty ACC		Kazakhstan
UACN	Astana	Astana ACC		Kazakhstan
UAII	Shymkent	Shymkent ACC		Kazakhstan
UATT	Aktobe	Aktobe ACC		Kazakhstan
UBBA	Baku	Baku ACC		Azerbaijan
UCFM	Bishkek	Bishkek ACC		Kyrgyzstan
UCFO	Osh	Osh ACC		Kyrgyzstan
UDDD	Yerevan	Yerevan ACC		Armenia
UEEE	Yakutsk	Yakutsk ACC		Russian Federation
UGGG	Tbilisi	Tbilisi ACC		Georgia
UHHH	Khabarovsk	Khabarovsk ACC		Russian Federation
UHMM	Magadan	Magadan ACC	Oceanic	Russian Federation
UIII	Irkutsk	Irkutsk ACC		Russian Federation
UKBV	Kyiv	Kyiv ACC		Ukraine
UKDV	Dnipro	Dnipro ACC		Ukraine
UKFV / URFV	Simferopol	Simferopol ACC		Ukraine (de-jure)/Russian Federation (de-facto)
UKLV	Lviv	Lviv ACC		Ukraine
UKOV	Odesa	Odesa ACC		Ukraine
ULLL	Sankt-Peterburg	Sankt-Peterburg ACC	Oceanic	Russian Federation
UMKK	Kaliningrad	Kaliningrad ACC		Russian Federation
UMMV	Minsk	Minsk ACC		Belarus
UNKL	Krasnoyarsk	Krasnoyarsk ACC		Russian Federation
UNNT	Novosibirsk	Novosibirsk ACC		Russian Federation
URRV	Rostov-Na-Donu	Rostov-Na-Donu ACC		Russian Federation
USSV	Yekaterinburg	Yekaterinburg ACC		Russian Federation
USTV	Tyumen	Tyumen ACC		Russian Federation
UTAA	Ashgabat	Ashgabat ACC		Turkmenistan
UTAK	Turkmenbashi	Turkmenbashi ACC		Turkmenistan
UTAT	Dashoguz	Dashoguz ACC		Turkmenistan
UTAV	Turkmenabat	Turkmenabat ACC		Turkmenistan
UTDD	Dushanbe	Dushanbe ACC		Tajikistan
UUWV	Moscow	Moscow ACC		Russian Federation
UWWW	Samara	Samara ACC		Russian Federation
UZSD	Samarkand	Samarkand ACC		Uzbekistan
UZTR	Tashkent	Tashkent ACC		Uzbekistan
VABF	Mumbai	Mumbai ACC		India
VCCF	Colombo	Colombo ACC		Sri Lanka
VDPF	Phnom Penh	Phnom Penh ACC		Cambodia
VECF	Kolkata	Kolkata ACC		Bhutan/India
VGFR	Dhaka	Dhaka ACC		Bangladesh
VHHK	Hong Kong	Hong Kong ACC		Hong Kong
VIDF	Delhi	Delhi ACC		India
VLVT	Vientiane	Vientiane ACC		Laos
VNSM	Kathmandu	Kathmandu ACC		Nepal
VOMF	Chennai	Chennai ACC		India
VRMF	Male	Male ACC		Maldives
VTBB	Bangkok	Bangkok ACC		Thailand
VVHM	Ho Chi Minh	Ho Chi Minh ACC		Vietnam
VVHN	Hanoi	Hanoi ACC		Vietnam
VYYF	Yangon	Yangon ACC		Myanmar
WAAF	Ujung Pandang	Ujung Pandang ACC		Indonesia/Timor Leste
WBFC	Kota Kinabalu	Kota Kinabalu ACC		Brunei/Malaysia
WIIF	Jakarta	Jakarta ACC		Indonesia
WMFC	Kuala Lumpur	Kuala Lumpur ACC		Malaysia
WSJC	Singapore	Singapore ACC		Singapore
YBBB	Brisbane	Brisbane ACC		Australia
YMMM	Melbourne	Melbourne ACC		Australia/Antarctica between 75°E and 163°E
ZBPE	Beijing	Beijing ACC		China
ZGZU	Guangzhou	Guangzhou ACC		China
ZHWH	Wuhan	Wuhan ACC		China
ZJSA	Sanya	Sanya ACC		China
ZKKP	Pyongyang	Pyongyang ACC		North Korea
ZLHW	Lanzhou	Lanzhou ACC		China
ZMUB	Ulaanbaatar	Ulan Bator ACC		Mongolia
ZPKM	Kunming	Kunming ACC		China
ZSHA	Shanghai	Shanghai ACC		China
ZWUQ	Urumqi	Urumqi ACC		China
ZYSH	Shenyang	Shenyang ACC		China
