= ATC Zero =

Event where air traffic control is unavailable

ATC Zero (Air Traffic Control Zero) is an official term used by the U.S. Federal Aviation Administration (FAA) that means the FAA is unable to safely provide the published air traffic control (ATC) services within the airspace managed by a specific facility. The term is always used in conjunction with a facility reference. FAA ATC facilities include Air Route Traffic Control Centers (ARTCC); Terminal Radar Control facility (TRACON), Air Traffic Control Tower (ATCT), Flight Service Stations (FSS), or the Air Traffic Control System Command Center (ATCSCC). The term is defined in FAA Order JO 1900.47, Air Traffic Control Operational Contingency Plans. It is one of three designations used by the FAA (ATC Alert, ATC Limited, and ATC Zero) to describe degraded operations and invoke operational contingency plans.

ATC Zero is declared in response to an event when it is determined the controlling facility, or significant portion thereof, is unable to safely provide the published air traffic services, or provide traffic flow management in the case of the ATCSCC. ATC services generally refer to specific communication, navigation, or surveillance capabilities. Any or all of the published services could be impacted by a natural or deliberate act that results in short or long term ATC service degradation. Examples of events that might result in degraded operations include technical system failures, errant construction, hurricanes, tornadoes, floods, wild fires, earthquakes, pandemic, terrorism, or war.

The term was used in a USA Today article quoting an official immediately after 9/11 terrorist attacks supposedly referring to the blanket ban on aviation although the term is not as all embracing as that.

Under ATC Zero conditions, normal flight operations are suspended. Residual capabilities will dictate what type flights can be continued. Instrument Flight Rule flights are not permitted as safe separation cannot be assured under ATC Zero. If weather conditions permit, Visual Flight Rules flights can be continued if they do not impact military or emergency response flights. The ATC Zero condition and any additional specific restrictions would be published by the FAA as a Temporary Flight Restriction (TFR) for the airspace involved. The TFR would state what aircraft are permitted into the affected airspace (e.g., military, first responders, fire fighting, surveillance) and under what constraints and requirements those flights can operate.

When an ATC Zero condition is declared, aircraft going to a destination inside the affected airspace may be required to divert to an alternate or re-route around the affected airspace. Aircraft already in the affected airspace would transition to VFR procedures, maintain their last clearance as able (trajectory, altitude, airspeed, heading), attempt to establish communication with other aircraft or ground assets to effect procedural self-separation, and then as able may decide to land or continue to an alternate outside the affected airspace.

== Incidents ==
On August 25, 2018, Miami International Airport (MIA) declared ATC Zero following a power outage at the Miami TRACON

On December 15, 2021, Kansas City International Airport (MCI) declared ATC Zero for approximately one hour when a winter storm brought 80+ MPH gusts prompting a rare evacuation of the tower which at the time was 265’ high.

On March 6, 2023, Miami ARTCC and Jacksonville ARTCC declared ATC Zero for approximately one hour following "technical issues" affecting the radar system.

On March 31, 2025, Phoenix Sky Harbor International Airport TRACON and ATCT declared ATC Zero for approximately twenty minutes when a fire alarm was triggered in the building.

On June 26, 2025, a fire affecting the Albuquerque Air Route Traffic Control Center caused ATC Zero for a region affecting Arizona, New Mexico, and West Texas.

On October 6, 2025, due to staffing issues resulting from the 2025 United States federal government shutdown, the Hollywood Burbank Airport ATCT was declared ATC Zero.

On January 26, 2026, Winter Storm Fern caused a staffing shortage at the Nashville International Airport. The FAA subsequently declared ATC Zero.

== See also ==
- NORDO procedures for inflight aircraft are similar
