= List of airports in the Los Angeles area =

The following is a list of airports in Greater Los Angeles, the second-largest urban region area in the United States, encompassing the five counties in Southern California that surround the city of Los Angeles.

The region is served by six airports with commercial air service, which combined, served 114 million passengers in 2019. The region also hosts a major cargo airport, four military airfields, and two dozen general aviation airports.

== Commercial airports ==
Commercial aviation airports of the Greater Los Angeles area
Green = International airport
Blue = Domestic airport

=== Los Angeles International Airport ===
Los Angeles International Airport commonly referred to by its airport code, LAX (with each of its letters pronounced individually), is the primary international airport serving the Greater Los Angeles Area and the world's eighth busiest airport. Located in the Westchester neighborhood of Los Angeles, it is 18 miles (30 km) southwest of Downtown Los Angeles and close to the Pacific Ocean.

LAX is a major international gateway to the United States, and also serves a connection point for passengers traveling internationally. LAX is the world's busiest origin and destination airport, since relative to other airports, many more travelers begin or end their trips in Los Angeles than use it as a connection. LAX serves as a major hub or focus city for seven airlines, more than any other airport in the United States. In 2019, LAX handled over 88 million passengers and 2 million tons of cargo.

The FlyAway express bus system connects LAX with Los Angeles Union Station, the region's primary rail transportation hub.

=== John Wayne Airport ===
John Wayne Airport (SNA) is an international airport and the second-busiest airport in the region. Located in Santa Ana in Orange County, the second-most populous county in the area and the most densely populated, the airport serves as a gateway to many of the region's popular tourist attractions, including the Disneyland Resort. It served 10.7 million passengers in 2019.

=== Hollywood Burbank Airport ===
Hollywood Burbank Airport (BUR), the smallest of the primary airports in the area, handles only domestic air service. The airport is located in Burbank, and serves the heavily populated areas of northern Los Angeles County. It is the closest airport to the central and northeastern parts of L.A. (including Hollywood and Downtown Los Angeles), Glendale, Pasadena, the San Fernando Valley, the Santa Clarita Valley, and the western San Gabriel Valley. In addition to its small physical size, the airport only has 14 gates and for the purposes of noise abatement, only schedules commercial flights between 7:00 am and 10:00 pm. Despite these limitations, Burbank is the region's third-busiest airport, handling 6 million passengers in 2019.

Hollywood Burbank Airport is the only airport in the area with a direct rail connection to Downtown Los Angeles from two stations, Burbank Airport–North and Burbank Airport–South.

=== Ontario International Airport ===
Ontario International Airport (ONT) is located in the San Bernardino County city of Ontario, east of Los Angeles, and is a more convenient option for residents in the Inland Empire and the eastern San Gabriel Valley. It served 5.6 million passengers in 2019.

The airport is the West Coast cargo hub for UPS Airlines, with 924,160 tons of cargo landed at the airport in 2020.

=== Long Beach Airport ===
Long Beach Airport (LGB) is the least busy of the airports in the area. The airport is located in Long Beach, south of Los Angeles. It served 3.6 million passengers in 2019.

=== San Bernardino International Airport ===
San Bernardino International Airport (SBD) is in the city of San Bernardino and is the former Norton Air Force Base. There is currently only one commercial airline operating within SBD, which is Breeze Airways.

== Military airfields ==
- Joint Forces Training Base - Los Alamitos is in Orange County. It is the former Naval Air Station Los Alamitos.
- March Air Reserve Base is in Riverside County. It was previously named March Air Force Base.
- Naval Air Station Point Mugu is in Ventura County. Channel Islands Air National Guard Station and Coast Guard Air Station Los Angeles also use the airfield.
- U.S. Air Force Plant 42 is in Palmdale. It shares an airfield with Palmdale Regional Airport.

== General aviation airports ==
General aviation airports of the Los Angeles area

=== Towered airports ===
- Brackett Field (IATA: POC, ICAO: KPOC) is in La Verne.
- Camarillo Airport (IATA: CMA, ICAO: KCMA) is in Camarillo. It is the former Oxnard Air Force Base.
- Chino Airport (IATA: CNO, ICAO: KCNO) is in Chino.
- El Monte Airport (IATA: EMT, ICAO: KEMT) is in El Monte.
- Fullerton Municipal Airport (IATA: FUL, ICAO: KFUL) is in Fullerton.
- General William J. Fox Airfield (IATA: WJF, ICAO: KWJF) is in Lancaster.
- Hawthorne Municipal Airport (IATA: HHR, ICAO: KHHR) is in Hawthorne.
- Oxnard Airport (IATA: OXR, ICAO: KOXR) is in Oxnard.
- Palmdale Regional Airport (IATA: PMD, ICAO: KPMD) is in Palmdale. It previously had scheduled commercial service sporadically between the late 1960s and 2008.
- Riverside Municipal Airport (IATA: RAL, ICAO: KRAL) is in Riverside.
- Santa Monica Airport (IATA: SMO, ICAO: KSMO) is in Santa Monica.
- Southern California Logistics Airport (IATA: VCV, ICAO: KVCV) is in Victorville in San Bernardino County, far northeast of the city. It is the former George Air Force Base.
- Van Nuys Airport (IATA: VNY, ICAO: KVNY) is in the San Fernando Valley. It is the world's busiest general aviation airport.
- Whiteman Airport (IATA: WHP, ICAO: KWHP) is in the Northern San Fernando Valley.
- Zamperini Field (IATA: TOA, ICAO: KTOA) is in Torrance.

=== Non-towered airports ===
- Agua Dulce Airpark (FAA LID: L70) is in Agua Dulce.
- Apple Valley Airport (IATA: APV, ICAO: KAPV) is in Apple Valley.
- Cable Airport (IATA: CCB, ICAO: KCCB) is in Upland.
- Catalina Airport (IATA: AVX, ICAO: KAVX) is near Avalon, Santa Catalina Island.
- Compton/Woodley Airport (IATA: CPM, ICAO: KCPM) is in Compton.
- Corona Municipal Airport (IATA: AJO, ICAO: KAJO) is in Corona.
- Flabob Airport (IATA: RIR, ICAO: KRIR) is in Riverside.
- Perris Valley Airport (FAA LID: L65) is in Perris.
- Redlands Municipal Airport (IATA: REI, ICAO: KREI) is in Redlands.

== Other notable aviation facilities ==
- Los Angeles Police Department (LAPD) Hooper Heliport (4CA0) in Downtown Los Angeles.
- Los Angeles County Fire Department (LACoFD) Barton Heliport (KPAI) located at the southeast corner of Whiteman Airport (see above) in Pacoima.
- Goodyear Blimp Base Airport (64CL) in Carson.
- Hughes/Corporate Heliport (CL71) in Westchester, adjacent to Loyola Marymount University.

== Notable closed airports ==
- Grand Central Airport near Glendale.
- Marine Corps Air Station El Toro near Irvine, now in the process of redevelopment.
- Hughes Airport near Westchester, now home to Playa Vista.
- Disneyland Helipad, at the Disneyland Hotel in Orange County, closed in 1968.
- Rialto Municipal Airport (FAA LID: L67) in Rialto, closed in 2014.

== See also ==
- Burbank-Glendale-Pasadena Airport Authority Police
- Los Angeles Air Route Traffic Control Center
- Los Angeles Airport Police
- Los Angeles World Airports
