= Mauricio Silva =

Mauricio Silva may refer to:

- Maurício Borges Silva, Brazilian volleyball player
- Mauricio Silva (serial killer), American serial killer
