= Vancouver Area Control Centre =

- IATA: ZVR; ICAO: CZVR

Summary
- Coordinates: 49.137403°N 122.850022°W

Map
- Location within British Columbia

The Vancouver Area Control Centre is one of seven area control centres operated by Nav Canada. It is located in the Newton neighbourhood in the south central portion of Surrey, British Columbia, and is responsible for the enroute and terminal airspace of the Vancouver flight information region, which covers much of the southern half of British Columbia. Neighbouring flight information regions include Edmonton to the north and east, Seattle to the south, Oakland Oceanic to the west, and Anchorage to the northwest.

== Aerodrome classes ==
Within the Vancouver FIR are the following airports:

Class C:

- Abbotsford International Airport (CYXX)
- Boundary Bay Airport (CZBB)
- Langley Regional Airport (CYNJ)
- Pitt Meadows Regional Airport (CYPK)
- Vancouver Harbour Flight Centre (CYHC)
- Vancouver International Airport (CYVR)
- Victoria International Airport (CYYJ)

Class D:

- CFB Comox / Comox Valley Airport (CYQQ)
- Kelowna International Airport (CYLW)
- Prince George Airport (CYXS)

Class E:

- Campbell River Airport (CYBL)
- Canadian Rockies International Airport (CYXC, Cranbrook)
- Kamloops Airport (CYKA)
- Nanaimo Airport (CYCD)
- Northwest Regional Airport Terrace-Kitimat (CYXT)
- Penticton Regional Airport (CYYF)
- Port Hardy Airport (CYZT)
- Prince Rupert Airport (CYPR)
- Princeton Aerodrome (CYDC)
- Quesnel Airport (CYQZ)
- Sandspit Airport (CYZP)
- Smithers Airport (CYYD)
- Tofino-Long Beach Airport (CYAZ)
- Victoria Inner Harbour Airport (CYWH)
- West Kootenay Regional Airport (CYCG, Castlegar)
- Williams Lake Airport (CYWL)

== Peripheral radio sites ==
Within each FIR, there are transmitter sites that allow the relay of distant communication from aircraft back to the ACC. These links are called "Peripheral Stations". They re-transmit the voice and data communication over high speed data links between the ACC and the remote transmitter. There are several PALs in the Vancouver FIR, with their frequencies below given in megahertz:

- Bruce Peak (Saltspring Island): 124.075, 134.4 (Low)
- Burns Lake: 123.875, 132.525
- Castlegar: 134.2, 227.3
- Cranbrook [Low]: 133.6
- Enderby: 134.55, 381.9
- Kains Mountain (Holberg): 133.775
- Kamloops [Low]: 132.35, 133.5, 134.4, 236.0
- Kamloops [High]: 134.4, 135.5, 236.0
- Port Hardy [Low]: 132.2, 266.3
- Port Hardy [High]: 134.6, 266.3
- Prince George: 133.8
- Prince Rupert: 133.675
- Princeton: 135.0, 351.3
- Puntzi Mountain: 135.05
- Richmond (Sea Island): 127.925, 133.7, 134.8, 135.325 (Low), 245.0, 350.7
- Sandspit [Low]: 227.2
- Sandspit [High]: 133.4, 227.2
- Terrace: 128.4, 269.1
- Tofino: 132.9, 134.925, 254.9
- Williams Lake [Low]: 134.0, 381.4
- Williams Lake [High]: 120.675, 134.0, 381.4

== See also ==
- Canadian airspace

== External link ==
- An inside look at Vancouver Air Traffic Control
