= ZSE =

ZSE may refer to:

- Zagreb Stock Exchange in Zagreb, Croatia
- Zimbabwe Stock Exchange in Harare
- Pierrefonds Airport in Saint-Pierre, Réunion (IATA airport code)
- Seattle Air Route Traffic Control Center, abbreviated ZSE
