= Oakland Center =

Oakland Center may refer to

- Oakland Air Route Traffic Control Center, referred to on the radio as "Oakland Center."
- Oakland City Center
- 12th Street Oakland City Center station, a BART station.
