= Mauricio Silva (serial killer) =

American serial killer on death row

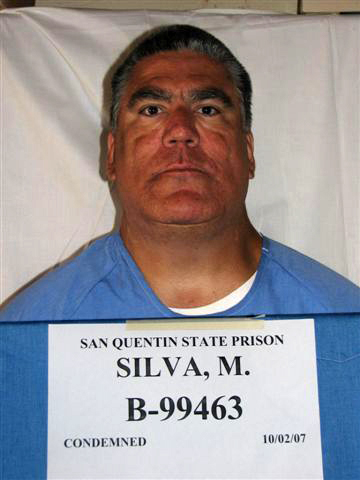
- Born: Mauricio Rodriguez Silva; October 25, 1959 (age 66); Los Angeles, California, U.S.
- Other name: "The Monster"
- Convictions: First degree murder with special circumstances (3 counts); Voluntary manslaughter
- Penalty: Death

Details
- Victims: 4
- Span of crimes: 1978–1984
- Country: United States
- State: California
- Date apprehended: May 26, 1984
- Imprisoned at: California Substance Abuse Treatment Facility and State Prison, Corcoran

Mauricio Rodriguez Silva (born October 25, 1959), known as The Monster, is an American serial killer who killed three people, including his half-sister, during a May 1984 crime spree that spread across California, shortly after being paroled from serving a manslaughter conviction. He was convicted of the latter crimes and sentenced to death and is currently awaiting execution.

== Early life ==
Mauricio Rodriguez Silva was born on October 25, 1959, in Los Angeles. He was the elder of two sons born to David Acosta Silva, an itinerant laborer from Chihuahua, Mexico, and his Nicaraguan wife Myrne Rodríguez, who suffered from gigantism and unspecified mental abnormalities. Mauricio inherited his mother's condition, in addition to being born with a cleft palate and other physical defects. His father, a prolific womanizer, abandoned the family when Silva was still young and was later killed by a colleague working in Alaska. Not long after, his mother left both children to the care of their grandmother in Mexico City, while she had an affair with her boss, with whom she had a daughter she named Martha Kitzler.

While residing with his grandmother, Silva and his brother were neglected – according to court records, she locked them outside of the house, and they had to resort to eating a pumpkin for days, for which they had to undergo treatment in the hospital for stomach infections. Silva eventually ran away and joined a gang of homeless children, where he started inhaling glue and eating scraps of garbage to survive. During this time, he claimed to have seen several of his friends and acquaintances be sexually assaulted by older men but was too afraid to notify the authorities.

For the remainder of his teenage years, Silva was transferred to and from various foster homes in the United States and Mexico. He did not know how to write and had trouble interacting with others. He was sent to the White Memorial Hospital to undergo an operation that would fix his cleft palate.

=== First murder and imprisonment ===
In 1978, the 18-year-old Silva got into an argument with an acquaintance, 18-year-old Troy Allison Covella. For reasons unclear, he pulled out a gun and shot Covella nine times, killing him. Silva was quickly arrested and charged with the murder, but he accepted a plea deal that had the charges reduced to voluntary manslaughter. He was convicted of the charge and sentenced to 5 1/5 years of imprisonment, which he spent at the Soledad State Prison in Soledad.

== Release and killing spree ==
After serving out his sentence, Silva was released on May 7, 1984, after which he moved in to live with his half-sister and some relatives at their apartment in Hollywood.

On May 18, Silva was riding on a bus when he encountered 16-year-old Walter P. Sanders, a runaway from Lompoc, whom he proceeded to shoot five times with a shotgun in the Mojave Desert and then dumped his body in a rural area of the Antelope Valley. Six days later, Silva picked up 16-year-old Monique Michelle Hilton at a bus stop on Santa Monica Boulevard. She was a runaway from Illinois who hitchhiked to Hollywood to meet Michael Jackson. Instead of driving her to her intended destination, he shot her twice and dumped her body near the Palmdale Regional Airport. Just four days later, Silva went back to his half-sibling Kitzler's apartment in Hollywood, where he strangled her, stabbed her eight times, then slit her throat. Soon after Kitzler's body was discovered, an arrest warrant was issued for Silva, who went on the run.

== Confession, trial and sentence ==
On May 28, Silva went to the sheriff's department in Templeton and confessed to the two deputies present that he was wanted for murder and wanted to turn himself in. After looking into his claims, the deputies realized that a warrant had been issued for his arrest and immediately detained him. Upon impounding and inspecting the insides of his truck, they found a loaded sawed-off shotgun and a knife. Later that same day, Silva was transported to Los Angeles to face murder charges in Kitzler's death. He was eventually charged with two additional counts of murder concerning the murders of Sanders and Hilton but pleaded not guilty on all three counts.

Silva's attorney offered a plea deal to the prosecutors that would allow his client to plead guilty and receive a sentence of life imprisonment without parole, but this was rejected by District Attorney Lonnie Felker, who said that Silva's actions warranted the death penalty. Silva was eventually found guilty on all counts, with his lawyers attempting to present mitigating circumstances by claiming that the killings were done on impulse and that Silva's horrible upbringing greatly affected his mental state. The case eventually resulted in a hung jury, and a mistrial was declared to the great dissatisfaction of Felker, who complained that the defense had used a loophole in the law to garner sympathy for the defendant by showing photographs of his early life and relatives to the jurors. As a result, a re-sentencing trial was scheduled for mid-November 1985.

For unclear reasons, the trial was delayed until early 1986, when Silva was retried for the three murders. The only new testimony presented at the second trial was claimed by the prosecutors that he may have raped Kitzler and that he had supposedly told the arresting police officers that he wanted to plead guilty and receive the death sentence to "get it over with." As a result, Silva was found guilty on all counts and was ultimately sentenced to death.

== Aftermath ==
In 2001, the Supreme Court of California nullified Silva's death sentence because the prosecution had erroneously excused a Latino juror, identified only as "Jose M.", on the grounds of his race. This claim was contended by Felker, who said that he had excused the man for being aggressive and for fearing that he would be in favor of a life sentence without parole. The death sentence was later reinstated, and Silva was returned to death row.

As of August 2022, Silva remains on death row and awaits execution. He has stated in several interviews that while he acknowledges that he is guilty, he will fight to have his sentence reduced to life without parole, arguing that he would suffer more by being left alive rather than executed. During these interviews, he has repeatedly emphasized that young men and women should speak up about their experiences with sexual abuse to prevent themselves from becoming like him.

== See also ==
- Capital punishment in California
- List of death row inmates in the United States § California
- List of serial killers in the United States
