= Oakland Air Route Traffic Control Center =

Air traffic control center

Coordinates: 37.5430°N 122.0160°W

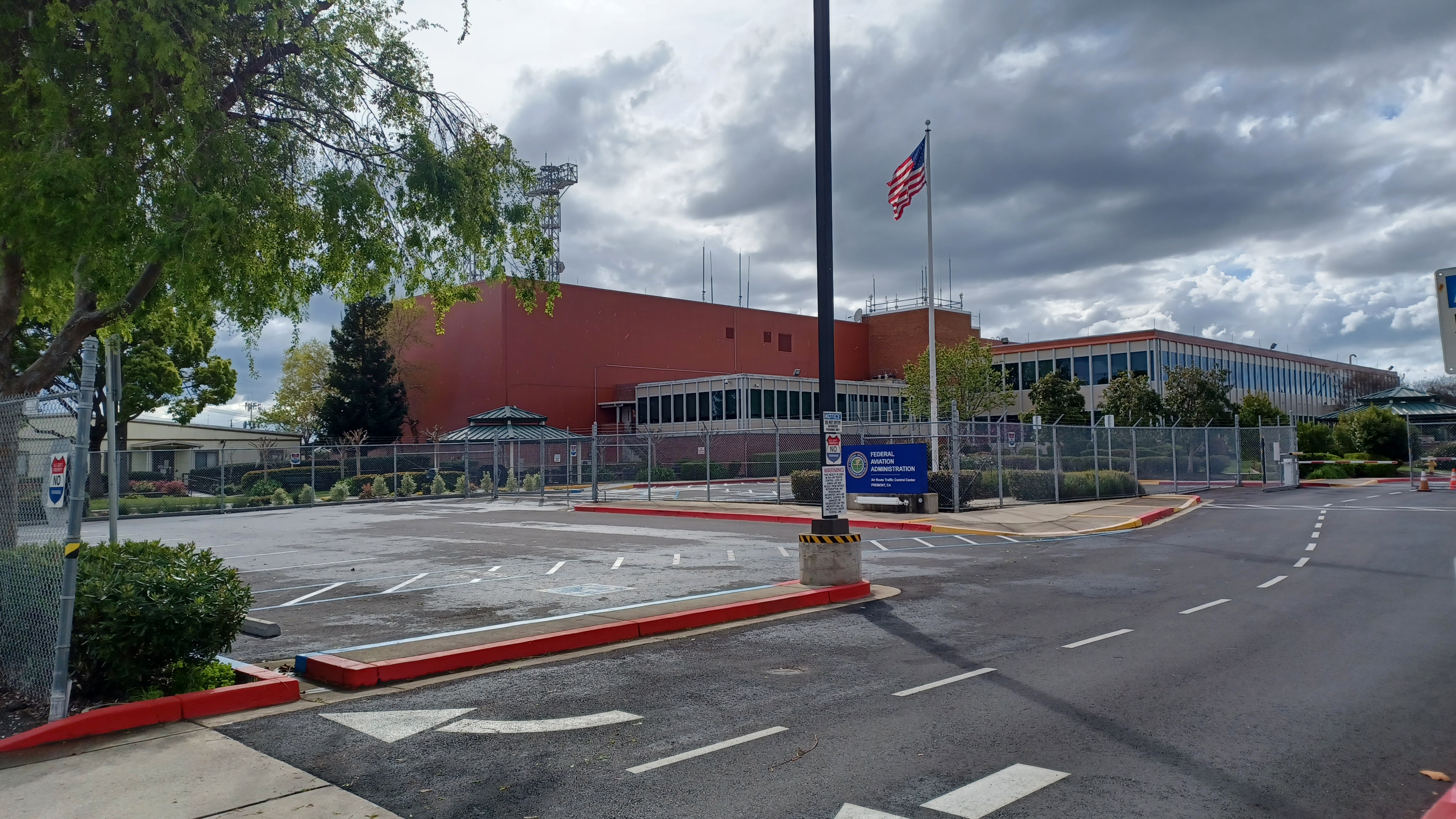
Oakland ARTCC in Fremont, California

Oakland Air Route Traffic Control Center (ZOA), (radio communications, "Oakland Center") is one of 22 Area Control Centers in the United States. It is located at 5125 Central Ave, Fremont, California, roughly 25 miles southeast of downtown Oakland in the East Bay.

The primary responsibility of Oakland Center is sequencing and separation of over-flights, arrivals, and departures, in order to provide safe, orderly, and expeditious flow of aircraft filed under instrument flight rules (IFR), as well as provide flight following for visual flight rules (VFR) aircraft.

Oakland Center is the 17th busiest ARTCC in the United States. In 2024, Oakland Center handled 1,738,338 aircraft. Domestically, KZOA Center covers approximately 140,000 square miles of the Western United States, including much of northern California (especially the San Francisco Bay Area), western Nevada, and KZAK Oceanic also covers 18.7 million square miles of the Pacific Ocean, roughly 9.5% of the Earth's total surface area, making this the largest Area Control Center in the world by controlled surface area.

Oakland Center lies adjacent to 21 different domestic air facilities, including Seattle Air Route Traffic Control Center, Los Angeles Air Route Traffic Control Center, and Salt Lake City Air Route Traffic Control Center. ZOA overlies or abuts several approach control facilities (including Northern California TRACON).

There is a total of 23 sectors in Oakland Center.
