= ZFW =

ZFW may refer to:

- Fort Worth Air Route Traffic Control Center, an Area Control Center in Fort Worth, Texas, United States
- Zero-fuel weight, the weight of an aircraft without fuel on board
- ZFW, the IATA code for Fairview Airport, Alberta, Canada
