= Los Angeles Air Route Traffic Control Center =

Area control center of the United States

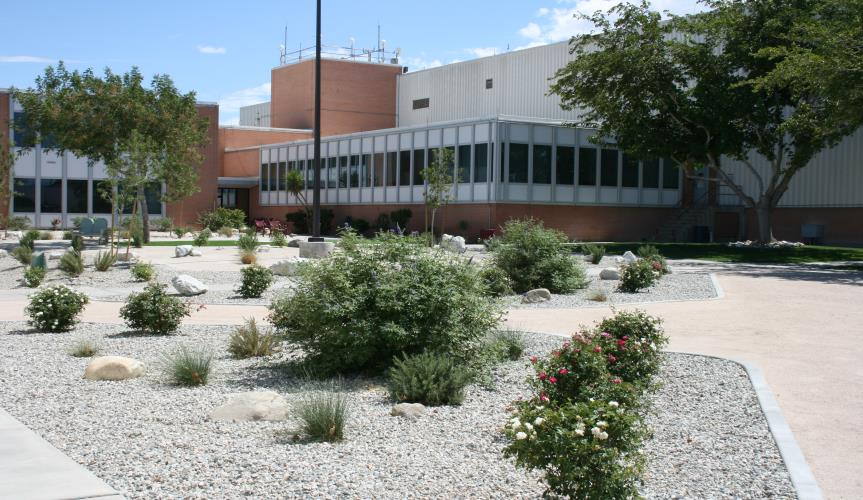
- The Los Angeles ARTCC in Palmdale, California
- IATA: none; ICAO: KZLA; FAA LID: ZLA

Summary
- Airport type: Area control center
- Owner/Operator: Federal Aviation Administration
- Serves: Parts of California, Nevada, Utah, and Arizona
- Location: Palmdale, California
- Opened: March 15, 1937
- Coordinates: 34°36′11.9″N 118°04′59.8″W
- Interactive map of Los Angeles Air Route Traffic Control Center

Statistics (2024)
- Aircraft operations: 2,375,008

The Los Angeles Air Route Traffic Control Center (ZLA) (radio communications, "Los Angeles Center" or "LA Center") is an air traffic control center located in Palmdale, California, United States. Located adjacent to United States Air Force Plant 42 and the Palmdale Regional Airport, it is one of 22 Air Route Traffic Control Centers (ARTCC) operated by the United States Federal Aviation Administration (FAA).

The Los Angeles ARTCC controls en route air traffic over southern and central California (including the Greater Los Angeles Area), southern Nevada, southwestern Utah, western Arizona, and portions of the Pacific Ocean Air Defense Identification Zone (ADIZ), with the exception of military airspace and lower-level airspace controlled by local airport towers and Terminal Control Centers (TRACON).

== History ==
The Los Angeles Air Route Traffic Control Center was established on March 15, 1937, being the fifth ARTCC established in the United States. The Los Angeles ARTCC was originally located in Burbank. In 1943, it was moved to Downtown Los Angeles on 7th Street and Flower Street. In 1946, it was again moved to just south of Los Angeles International Airport (LAX) in Inglewood on Manchester Boulevard. On March 1, 1963, the Los Angeles ARTCC was moved to its present location in Palmdale on 25th Street East and Avenue P, being located adjacent to United States Air Force Plant 42 and the Palmdale Regional Airport.

== Operations ==
The Los Angeles ARTCC controls 177,000 square miles (460,000 km^{2}) of airspace over southern and central California, southern Nevada, southwestern Utah, and western Arizona. It controls airspace from the surface up to FL600 (60,000 feet). Around 40 percent of the ARTCC's airspace is composed of special use airspace (SUA) which is used by the United States Armed Forces. The ARTCC's airspace is divided into six areas, simply named Areas A through F, which are further subdivided into 20 low level sectors and 16 high altitude sectors.

As of 2019, the ARTCC employs over 500 people, 320 of whom are air traffic controllers. The United States Department of Homeland Security provides security for the ARTCC.

In 2024, Los Angeles ARTCC was the sixth busiest ARTCC in the United States, and busiest ARTCC for VFR advisories. Between January 1, 2024 and December 31, 2024, the Los Angeles ARTCC handled 2,375,008 total aircraft operations, including 105,781 VFR operations.

== Airports ==
A total of 97 airports are located within the Los Angeles ARTCC. Additionally, there are also 8 Terminal Control Centers (TRACON): Bakersfield, High Desert, Nellis, Las Vegas, Santa Barbara, Southern California, and Yuma.

== See also ==
- List of airports in the Los Angeles area

== Bibliography ==
- "Facility Orientation Guide – Los Angeles Air Route Traffic Control Center (ARTCC)" (PDF). Federal Aviation Administration. p. 7.
