= Albuquerque Air Route Traffic Control Center =

Area control center in the US

Coordinates: 35°10′24.8″N 106°34′2.6″W

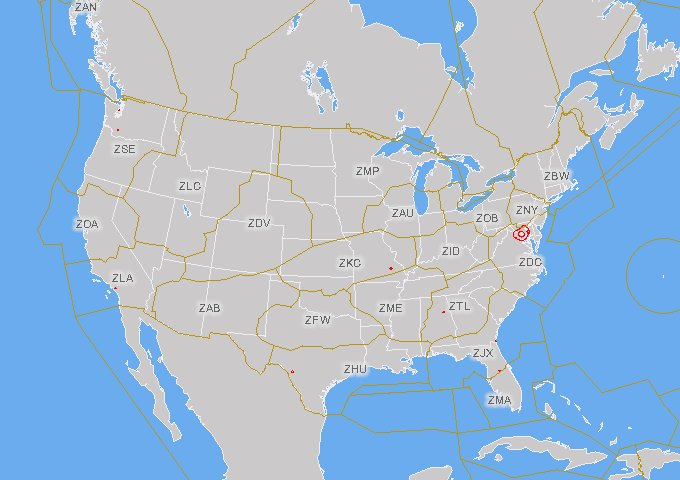
Map of ARTCCs in the US

Albuquerque Air Route Traffic Control Center (ZAB) (radio communications: Albuquerque Center) is located at 8000 Louisiana Boulevard, Albuquerque, New Mexico, United States. The Albuquerque ARTCC is one of 22 Air Route Traffic Control Centers in the United States.

The primary responsibility is the separation of overflights, and the expedited sequencing of arrivals and departures along STARs (Standard Terminal Arrival Routes) and SIDs (Standard Instrument Departures) for the airspace over most of Arizona and New Mexico, as well as parts of Colorado, Oklahoma, and Texas. Albuquerque Center is the 16th busiest ARTCC in the United States. In 2024, Albuquerque Center handled 1,799,593 aircraft.

ZAB covers an area that includes one class Bravo airport.

- Phoenix Sky Harbor International Airport (PHX) in Phoenix, AZ

ZAB also includes five class Charlie airports.

- Albuquerque International Sunport (ABQ) in Albuquerque, NM
- El Paso International Airport (ELP) in El Paso, TX
- Rick Husband Amarillo International Airport (AMA) in Amarillo, TX
- Tucson International Airport (TUS) in Tucson, AZ
- Davis Monthan Air Force Base (DMA) in Tucson, AZ

== Subdivision ==
ZAB's airspace is divided both geographically and altitudinally.

ZAB's primary subdivisions are known as specialties. There are five different specialties known as the North, East, Southeast, Southwest and Northwest. Each specialty is broken down further into 7 or 8 sectors.

By altitude, ZAB comprises 39 sectors (6 ultra-high sectors, 17 high-altitude sectors, 12 low-altitude sectors, and 4 low-high sectors). The vertical strata of these sectors vary greatly depending on the terrain, the geographic location covered, and the variety of traffic the controllers work.

=== North specialty ===
- *SANLO (16) | SANDIA | 132.8/346.35 | SFC - FL280
- LAVLO (17) | LAVAN | 124.325/288.25 | SFC - FL280
- BLKUH (58) | BLACK ROCK | 126.925/353.85 | FL370+
- ABQHI (68) | ALBUQUERQUE | 134.6/251.15 | FL290 - FL360
- OTOHI (79) | OTTO | 118.65/269.475 | FL370+
- GUPHI (93) | GALLUP | 120.55/285.4 | FL290 - FL360
- CNXLH (94) | CORONA | 133.65/284.6 | SFC - FL360

=== East specialty ===
- *BGDLO (15) | BORGER | 127.85/285.475 | SFC - FL280
- PANHI (70) | ESPAN | 120.95/263.1 | FL290+
- KENHI (71) | KENTO | 133.05/269.35 | FL290 - FL360
- CIMUH (72) | CIMARRON | 128.225/291.6 | FL370+
- LVSHI (95) | LAS VEGAS | 125.075/279.5 | FL290 - FL360
- TCCHI (96) | TUCUMCARI | 128.675/360.8 | FL370+
- AMAHI (97) | AMARILLO | 134.75/239.25 | FL290 - FL360
- DHTUH (98) | DALHART | 132.125/307.05 | FL370+

=== Southeast specialty ===
- DMNLO (19) | DEMING | 128.2/285.5 | SFC - FL350
- SFLLO (20) | SALT FLAT | 135.875/292.15 | SFC - FL270
- CVSLO (21) | CANNON | 126.85/285.6 | SFC - FL350
- ROWHL (23) | ROSWELL | 132.65/257.6 | SFC+
- *ELPHI (63) | EL PASO | 120.975/278.3 | FL280 - FL350
- FSTUH (78) | FORT STOCKTON | 133.225/270.35 | FL360+
- TXOHI (87) | TEXICO | 132.325/251.1 | FL360+
- SUNHI (89) | SUNLAND | 125.525/269.45 | FL360+

=== Southwest specialty ===
- GBNLO (42) | GILA BEND | 126.45/288.3 | SFC - FL250
- TUSLO (46) | TUCSON | 125.4/269.3 | SFC - FL250**
- SVCLO (47) | SILVER CITY | 134.45/327.15 | SFC - FL230
- TFDLO (49) | STANFIELD | 125.25/307.3 | SFC - 11,000'
- PHXUH (65) | PHOENIX | 132.45/371.9 | FL340+
- CIEUH (80) | CIMARRON | 126.225/341.7 | FL340+
- SSOHI (90) | SAN SIMON | 133.0/281.5 | FL240 - FL330
- *GBNHI (91) | GILA BEND | 135.15/350.2 | FL260 - FL330

**except over Sector 49 (12,000' - FL250)

=== Northwest specialty ===
- HIPHI (37) | HIPII | 134.325/259.3/263.05/279.55 | FL240 - FL290
- MIALH (38) | MIAMI | 132.9/239.05 | SFC - FL310
- FOSLH (39) | FOSIL | 135.725/339.8 | SFC - FL310
- *DRKLO (43) | DRAKE | 128.45/298.9 | SFC - FL230
- INWLO (45) | WINSLOW | 127.675/306.2 | SFC - FL290
- PAYHI (50) | PAYSON | 128.125/317.75 | FL320+
- INWHI (67) | WINSLOW | 133.925/282.35 | FL300+
- PRCHI (92) | PRESCOTT | 135.325/370.9 | FL300+

*Mid Shift Sector

== See also ==
- List of U.S. Air Route Traffic Control Centers
- List of flight information regions and area control centers
