= Honolulu Control Facility =

Honolulu Control Facility (HCF) (ICAO: PHZH, FAA LID: ZHN) is an air traffic control facility located in Honolulu, Hawaii, United States operated by the Federal Aviation Administration (FAA). This facility includes the Honolulu International Airport control tower and the Honolulu Center Radar Approach Control (CERAP), itself a combined TRACON-area control center unit covering the Pacific Ocean surrounding the Hawaiian Islands. More than 200 FAA staff work in the control facility. The FAA dedicated the facility in January 2002. Honolulu Control Facility is the 2nd least busy ARTCC in the United States. In 2024, Honolulu Control Facility handled 469,937 aircraft operations.

== Facility assets ==
According to Aviation Hawaii, "The complex includes an air traffic control operations room with 17 radar control positions, a service operations center for the Pacific, an electronic equipment room, a mechanical and electrical environmental area, administrative offices, building support warehouses, and an employee cafeteria."
