= Kabul ACC =

Air traffic control facility

Kabul Area Control Centre
- IATA: none; ICAO: OAKX

Summary
- Coordinates: 34°33′57″N 069°12′47″E

Map
- Location within Afghanistan

The Kabul Area Control Centre (ICAO: OAKX) was the only en route area control center (ACC) in Afghanistan. From the Kabul Area Control Centre, air traffic controllers provided en route and terminal control services to aircraft in the Kabul Flight Information Region (FIR). The ACC was managed by the Civil Aviation Authority of the Islamic Republic of Afghanistan.

== History ==
Midwest ATC provided the air traffic control staff for Kabul ACC, which was opened in 2005. The ACC used non-radar air traffic control to separate aircraft in Afghanistan's airspace.

== Closure ==
The Kabul ACC ceased operations on 16 August 2021 and was abandoned due to the deteriorating security situation. Air traffic control authorities issued a NOTAM alerting aircraft that no air traffic services were available over Afghanistan. Civilian and military air traffic control responsibilities were handed over to the United States Air Force. The U.S. military temporarily provided limited air traffic control services until they departed Kabul on 30 August 2021.

On 21 January 2023, the Federal Aviation Administration issued at NOTAM which stated all of Afghanistan's airspace is considered to be uncontrolled.
