= Anchorage Air Route Traffic Control Center =

Air traffic control facility in Alaska

Coordinates: 61°13′45″N 149°46′50″W

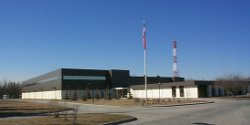
Anchorage Air Route Traffic Control Center

Anchorage Air Route Traffic Control Center (PAZA/ZAN, radio communications: Anchorage Center) is an Area Control Center operated by the Federal Aviation Administration just outside the main gate of Joint Base Elmendorf-Richardson at 700 North Boniface Parkway in Anchorage, Alaska, United States. The Anchorage ARTCC is one of 22 Air Route Traffic Control Centers in the United States. Anchorage Center is the 20th busiest ARTCC in the United States, making it the third least busy. In 2024, Anchorage Center handled 616,121 aircraft.

== Center breakdown ==
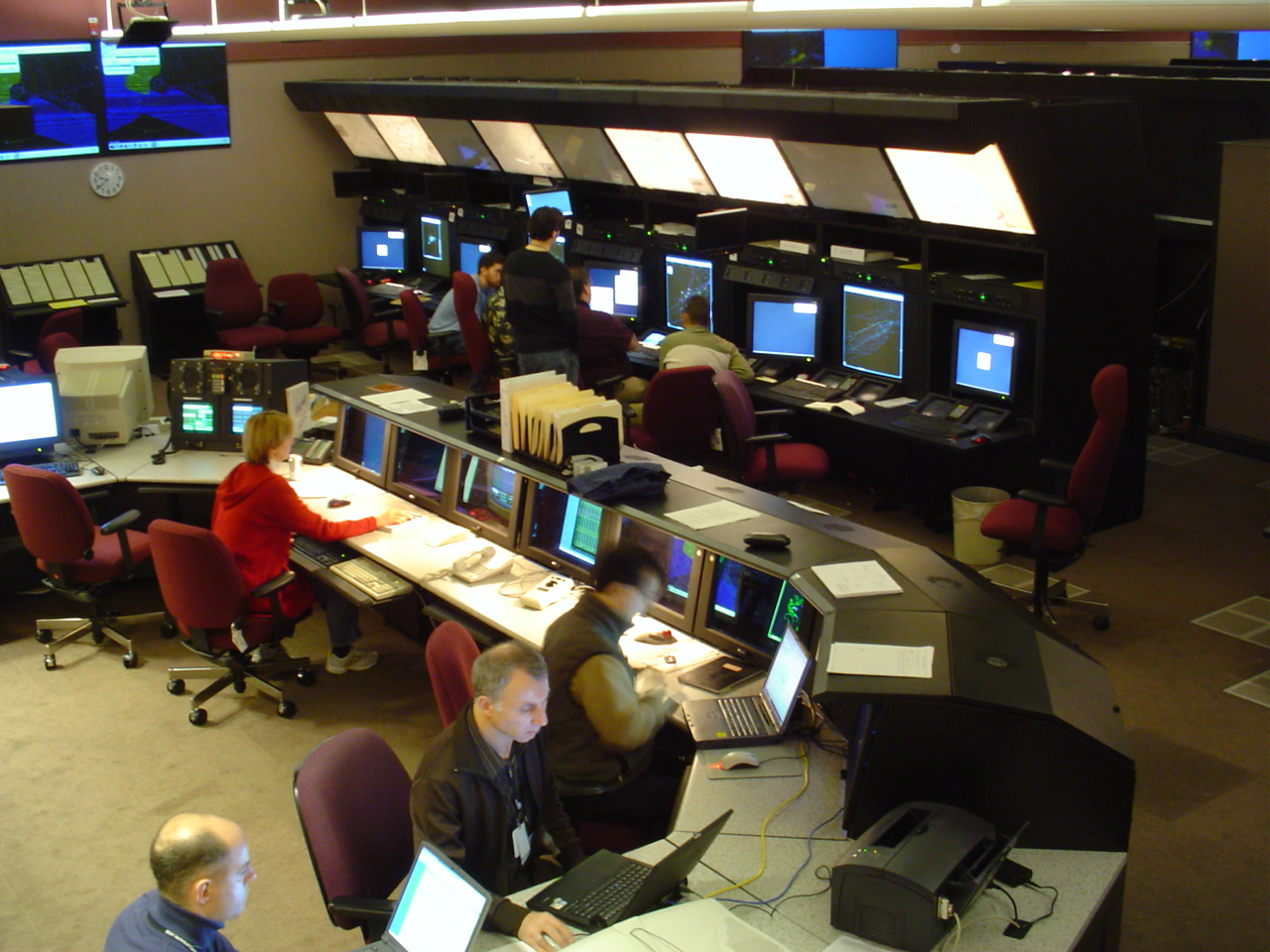
ATOP/Ocean21 Automation Platform.

Anchorage ARTCC (ZAN) is the northern, eastern, and westernmost center and is one of three designated oceanic centers. The Anchorage ARTCC has control responsibility for more than 2,500,000 square nautical miles (8,600,000 km^{2}) of airspace divided between three areas of specialization and 15 sectors. ZAN operates on two separate automation platforms, ATOP (Advanced Technologies & Oceanic Procedures) and MEARTS (Microprocessor En Route Automated Radar Tracking System)/FDP-2000 (Micro En Route Automated Radar Tracking System). The facility also makes use of other technology systems such as FDP2000, DOTS+, ANICS, ADS-B, ADS-C and Wide area multilateration (WAM).

Some of the sectors cover extremely large geographic areas and on average use more communications frequencies per sector than any other facility. RADAR coverage is limited to 55-60% of the airspace.

== Automation systems ==
=== MEARTS (Microprocessor En Route Automated Radar Tracking System) ===
The Microprocessor-En Route Automated Radar Tracking System (MEARTS) is a radar processing system implemented with commercial off-the-shelf (COTS) equipment, for use in the Anchorage, Alaska Air Route Traffic Control Center (ARTCC) and Center Radar Approach Control (CERAPs) environments. It provides single sensor and a mosaic display of traffic and weather using long- and short-range radars and at Anchorage it processes and displays Automatic Dependent Surveillance-Broadcast (ADS-B) surveillance as well. The MEARTS interfaces with multiple types of displays, including the flat panel Display System Replacement (DSR)(modified).

=== FDP2000 (Flight Data Processing 2000) ===
The Flight Data Processing 2000 (FDP2000) system replaced the oceanic flight data processing capability provided by Offshore Computer System (OCS) at the Anchorage Air Route Traffic Control Center (ARTCC). FDP2000 provides new hardware and software with added capabilities. The added capabilities include winds aloft modeling for improved aircraft position extrapolation accuracy, and support of Air Traffic Services Inter-facility Data Communications Systems (AIDC) ground-to-ground data link with compatible Flight Information Regions (FIRs). The OCS software was re-hosted from the Hewlett-Packard (HP) 1000 platform to the HP 9000 platform. FDP2000 provides flight data to the Microprocessor-En Route Automated Radar Tracking System (Micro-EARTS) radar data processing system. FDP2000 also integrates the existing Controller Pilot Data Link Communications (CPDLC) functions for data link communications with Future Air Navigation System 1/A (FANS 1/A)-equipped aircraft.

=== ATOP (Advanced Technologies and Oceanic Procedures) ===
The Advanced Technologies and Oceanic Procedures (ATOP) program replaced oceanic air traffic control systems and procedures and modernized the Air Route Traffic Control Center (ARTCC) facilities at Oakland, New York, and Anchorage. The ATOP program fully integrated flight and radar data processing, detects conflicts between aircraft, provides data link and surveillance capabilities, and automated the manual processes used previously. ATOP also reduced the workload on controllers through the use of electronic flight strips instead of the paper strip method used for decades to track trans- oceanic aircraft.

ATOP achieved full operating capability (FOC) at the New York, Oakland, and Anchorage ARTCCs in March 2005, October 2005, and April 2007, respectively.

The program provided the FAA the automation, Automatic Dependent Surveillance-Contract (ADS-C), and conflict resolution capability required to reduce aircraft separation from 100 nautical miles (190 km) to 30 nautical miles (56 km). ATOP also allows the FAA to meet international commitments and helps the FAA avoid losing delegated airspace used by air carriers and military flights.

Since the ATOP hardware was procured in 2001 many components have reached end of life. The present contract has provisions for technology refresh in FY 2008 to initiate ATOP hardware technology refresh at the FAA William J. Hughes Technical Center (WJHTC) and Oakland Air Route Traffic Control Center (ARTCC). This is part of the plan to implement a total system upgrade midway through the planned ATOP system life cycle. The refresh is scheduled to replace operating systems and all major system components (e.g., servers, workstations, communications switches, and interface gateways) with state-of-the-art components available at that time.

The technology refresh is planned for 2008–2009.

=== DOTS+ (Dynamic Ocean Track System Plus) ===
The Dynamic Ocean Track System Plus (DOTS+) automation system is located in each of the three Oceanic Air Route Traffic Control Centers (ARTCCs), (Anchorage, Oakland, and New York) and in the David J. Hurley Air Traffic Control System Command Center (ATCSCC). The DOTS, upgraded and frequently referred to as "DOTS +", permits airlines to save fuel by flying random routes, in contrast to structured routes, and permits the air traffic controller to achieve lateral spacing requirements more efficiently. The DOTS generates flexible oceanic tracks that are optimized for best airspace utilization and best time/fuel efficiency. Flexible tracks are updated twice a day using forecasted winds aloft and separation (vertical and lateral) requirements. The DOTS oceanic traffic display gives a visual presentation of tracks and weather. The DOTS sends traffic advisories and track advisories to users and receives aircraft progress reports from the commercial communications service providers (CCSP). These external data exchanges are achieved through interfaces with the National Airspace Data Interchange Network (NADIN) Packet Switch Network (PSN) for Position Reports, Air Traffic Management (ATM) messages, Pilot Reports (PIREPS), and the Anchorage FDP2000. An interface to the Enhanced Traffic Management System (ETMS) will improve coordination between the oceanic and domestic Traffic Flow Management (TFM) systems/activities. The DOTS Weather Server, installed at the ATCSCC, receives National Weather Service (NWS) wind and temperature data via the Weather and Radar Processor / Weather Information Network Server (WARP/WINS) system. The weather data is then distributed to the ARTCCs via commercially provided Integrated Services Digital Network (ISDN) telephone lines. DOTS+ supports separation reduction initiatives as stipulated in RNP-10 (Required Navigation Performance) for decreasing lateral separation from 100 nautical miles (190 km) to 50 nautical miles (93 km).

=== ANICS (Alaska NAS Interfacility Communications System) ===
Key Note: The Alaskan NAS Interfacility Communications System (ANICS) program has been renamed to Alaska Satellites Telecommunication Infrastructure (ASTI) during Concept and Requirements Definition (CRD) phase of the Acquisition Management System (AMS). The Investment Analysis Readiness Decision (IARD) was approved on March 19, 2008.

ANICS provides wide area NAS telecommunication services within the state of Alaska and connectivity to NAS facilities within Alaska from NAS facilities outside of Alaska.

ANICS service is provided by FAA-owned satellite earth stations and leased transponders on two communications satellites. NAS facilities are connected to ASTI demarcation points through access circuits. These access circuits may be implemented by a copper or fiber optic cable, microwave radio, or leased services. Communications interfaces provide for Voice Grade (VG) services (VG1, VG2, VG3, VG5, VG6, VG7, VG8, VG10) and for digital services for data rates from 300 bit/s to 1.544 Mbit/s.

The ANICS equipment provides remote maintenance monitoring and control. The equipment is controlled and operated from the Network Control Center (NCC) using the Harris Corporation Air Traffic Network Manager (ATNM), centrally located in the Anchorage (KZAN) Air Route Traffic Control Center (ARTCC).

ANICS Phase 1 (ANICS P1) provides critical communications with 99.99% availability at 52 sites by using two sets of ground station equipment and two satellite transponders to create two parallel communication paths with switchover capability.

ANICS Phase 2 (ANICS P2) sites provide essential communications with 99.9% availability at 12 sites by using one set of ground station equipment and one satellite transponder. Phase 2 ground station sites are enclosed in radomes that protect the equipment and antenna from the weather. Additional Information: http://download.harris.com/app/public_download.asp?fid=416

=== ADS-B (Automatic Dependent Surveillance - Broadcast) ===
Anchorage Air Route Traffic Control was the first facility in the world to begin using Automatic Dependent Surveillance-Broadcast (ADS) for air traffic control separation services using a 5 nautical miles (9.3 km) separation standard. It was first deployed on January 1, 2001, in that portion of western Alaska known as the Yukon-Kuskokwim Delta/Bristol Bay regions.

ADS-B will be implemented by the Surveillance and Broadcast Services (SBS) Program to provide two services: (1) "Critical Services" consisting of ADS-B and ADS-Rebroadcast, and (2) "Essential Services" consisting of Traffic Information Service Broadcast (TIS-B) and Flight Information Service Broadcast (FIS-B). Nine ADS-B enabled applications will be developed and assessed: (1) ATC Surveillance, (2) Enhanced Visual Acquisition, (3) Enhanced Visual Approach, (4) Final Approach and Runway Occupancy Awareness, (5) Airport Surface Situational Awareness, (6) Conflict Detection for flight and Air Traffic Management (ATM) operations, (7) CDTI/MFD Assisted Visual Separation (CAVS), (8) Interval Management (e.g., merging and spacing) and (9) Weather and NAS Status Situational Awareness. SBS will provide data to FAA defined Service Delivery Points (SDP) as the demarcation points between SBS-provided services and ground-based user systems.

Implementation: The SBS applications span all national airspace domains (Oceanic, En Route, Terminal and Surface) and require tightly coupled coordination with the Terminal and En Route Service Units. Interfaces will be integrated to all major automation platforms that serve the NAS - En Route Automation Modernization (ERAM), HOST Computer System (HCS), Microprocessor En Route Automated Radar Tracking System (MEARTS), Standard Terminal Automation Replacement System (STARS), Common Automated Radar Terminal System (CARTS) and Advanced Technologies and Oceanic Procedures (ATOP).

SBS will be implemented in two segments. The SBS Program will develop connectivity and validate ADS-B suitability for ATC services through integration to the five primary automation platforms and establish an In-Service Decision (ISD) on ADS-B, ADS-R, TIS-B and FIS-B in Segment 1 by 2010. Additional capabilities (e.g., integration with ATOP) will be addressed as system enhancements in Segment 2 by 2013.

The SBS vendor will install and own about 340 SBS ground stations in three regions of the U.S. by 2010 with an option to install over 400 more by 2013. The SBS vendor will provide SBS capability to the FAA under a fee-for-services arrangement.

SBS - Segment 1: The SBS Program has achieved Segment 1 milestones up to contract award, including the initiation of deployment of essential services (TIS-B and FIS-B) NAS-wide, and other ADS-B related programs activities. An ADS-B "Out" Notice of Proposed Rulemaking (NPRM) was also published. Key remaining Segment 1 implementation milestones are: 1. Complete deployment and certification of equipment to support service delivery in selected locations 2. Certify ADS-B as an approved surveillance source to support existing separation standards on five FAA automation platforms - ERAM, HOST, MEARTS,STARS, and CARTS 3. Publish ADS-B "Out" Final Rule 4. Confirm minimum avionics performance to ensure future utility. 5. Define additional aircraft to aircraft requirements 6. Achieve early benefits in non-radar airspace

ADS-B critical services (ADS-B downlink to ATC for separation) will be implemented at four key sites (service volumes): the Gulf of Mexico; Louisville, KY - Terminal Radar Approach Control (TRACON) and UPS GOC; Philadelphia, PA - TRACON; and Alaska Anchorage Center and Juneau Air Traffic Control Tower.

SBS - Segment 2: SBS capabilities will be activated in the remaining NAS service volumes with plans to complete NAS-wide deployment of ADS-B by 2013. The ADS-B "Out" Final Rule for broadcast will be published during the end of Segment 1 and beginning of Segment 2, providing an equipment baseline to continue user equipage and application development and deployment.

== Sectors, airports, navaids and frequencies ==
=== High Area ===
==== Sector 10/11 ====
===== Airports =====
- PADK/ADK – Adak
- PAAK/AKA – Atka
- PAPB/PBV – St. George
- PASN/SNP – St. Paul
- PASY/SYA – Shemya

===== Navaids =====
- ADK – Mount Moffett NDB
- NUD – Adak TACAN
- SRI – Priblof NDB/DME
- SYA – Shemya VORTAC/NDB

===== Frequencies (VHF/UHF) =====
- Adak – 126.4 254.3
- Shemya – 119.1 339.8
- St. Paul Island – 119.1 339.8

=== North Area ===
==== Sector 3 ====
===== Airports =====
- PAOM/OME - Nome
- PAOT/OTZ - Kotzbue

==== Sector 4 ====
===== Airports =====
- BRW - Utqiagvik

==== Sector 9 ====
===== Airports =====
- DUT - Dutch Harbor

==== Sector 13 ====
===== Airports =====
- BET - Bethel

==== Sector 15 ====
===== Airports =====
- FAI - Fairbanks

==== Sector 16 ====
===== Airports =====
- ORT - Northway

=== South Area ===
==== Sector 5 ====
===== Airports =====
- ENA - Kenai
- ILI - Illiamna
- 5NN - Non-Dalton
- OLT - Soldotna
- HOM - Homer
- SVW - Sparrevohn

==== Sector 6 ====
===== Airports =====
- ANC - Anchorage
- TKA - Talkeetna

==== Sector 7 ====
===== Airports =====
- MDO - Middileton Island
- GKN - Gulkana
- ORT - Northway

==== Sector 14 ====
===== Airports =====
- VDZ - Valdez
- CDV - Cordova
- SWD - Seward
- 7KA - Tatitlek

==== Sector 8 ====
===== Airports =====
- YAK - Yakutat
- JNU - Juneau
- AKW - Klawock
- AFE - Kake
- KTN - Ketchikan
- WRG - Wrangell
- PSG - Petersburg
- SIT - Sitka
- HNH - Hoonah
- GST - Gustavus
- HNS - Haines
