= Palmdale Regional Airport =

Joint public-military airport in Palmdale, California

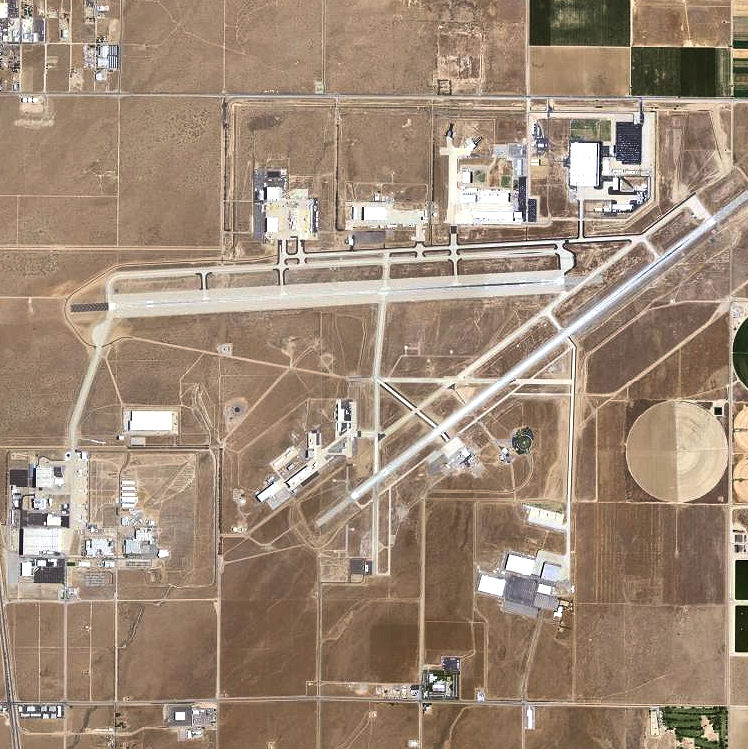
- USGS 2006 orthophoto
- IATA: PMD; ICAO: KPMD; FAA LID: PMD; WMO: 72382

Summary
- Airport type: Public/military (joint use)
- Owner/Operator: City of Palmdale & United States Air Force
- Serves: Palmdale, California
- Elevation AMSL: 2,543 ft / 775 m
- Coordinates: 34°37′43″N 118°05′04″W

Map
- Location of airport in California

Runways
| Direction | Length | | Surface |
| Direction | ft | m | Surface |
|---|---|---|---|
| 4/22 | 12,001 | 3,658 | Concrete |
| 7/25 | 12,002 | 3,658 | Concrete |
| 72/252 | 6,000 | 1,829 | Concrete |

Statistics (2008)
- Aircraft operations: 64,433
- Source: Federal Aviation Administration

Palmdale Regional Airport (IATA: PMD, ICAO: KPMD, FAA LID: PMD) is an airport in Palmdale, California, United States. The city of Palmdale took over the airport at the end of 2013, managing it via the Palmdale Airport Authority. The airport currently does not have any scheduled passenger airline service.

== Overview and facilities ==
PMD and Plant 42 are separate facilities that share a common runway at the site. The facility is located in the Antelope Valley, approximately 60 miles from downtown Los Angeles.

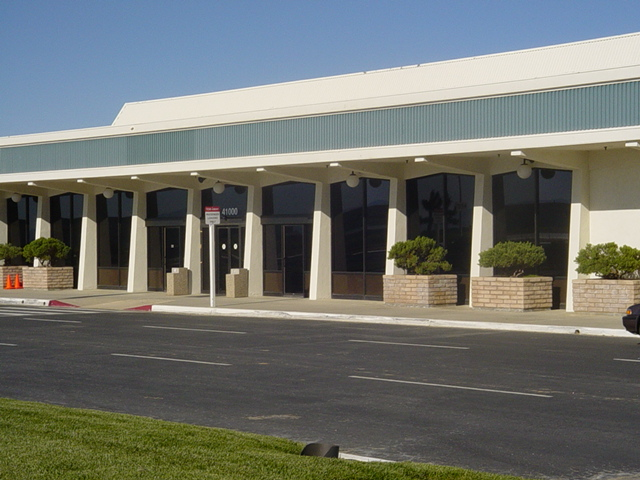
LA/Palmdale Regional Airport terminal

The airport covers 5,832 acres (2,360 ha) at an elevation of 2,543 feet (775 m) above mean sea level. It has three runways with concrete surfaces: 4/22 is 12,001 by 150 feet (3,658 x 46 m); 7/25 is 12,002 by 200 feet (3,658 x 61 m); 72/252 is 6,000 by 75 feet (1,829 x 23 m). 7/25 was built to withstand an 8.3 Richter Scale earthquake, making it one of the world's strongest runways. Another smaller runway, 72/252, is used as an assault strip.

In January 2024, Los Angeles County Supervisor Kathryn Barger announced a Board-approved proposal for a preliminary site plan for a $1.6 billion, two million square foot bus and passenger rail car hub of manufacturing and innovation located on the eastern section of the airport's land holdings. The project is tentatively named the "Center for Transportation Excellence".

=== Museums ===
The Blackbird Airpark Museum and the adjacent Joe Davies Heritage Airpark (formerly the Palmdale Plant 42 Heritage Airpark) have been opened on Plant 42 property along Avenue P, with displays of the SR-71, U-2, Century Series fighters and other aircraft designed, engineered, manufactured, and flight tested at its facilities. Both museums are free to the public.

The Blackbird Airpark Museum is an extension of the AFFTC Museum at Edwards AFB, while the Heritage Airpark is operated by the city of Palmdale. Both are staffed by retirees who had previously worked in the aerospace industry, some actually having worked on the aircraft displayed at the two parks. All of the aircraft have been carefully restored for public display. The two airparks are located at Avenue P and 25th Street East near Site 9.

=== FAA operations ===
The Federal Aviation Administration (FAA) operates the Los Angeles Air Route Traffic Control Center (ARTCC) at its site near Plant 42 at Avenue P and 25th Street East. This center controls and tracks aircraft over much of the western United States, including parts of California, Arizona, Nevada, Utah and the Pacific Ocean.

== History ==
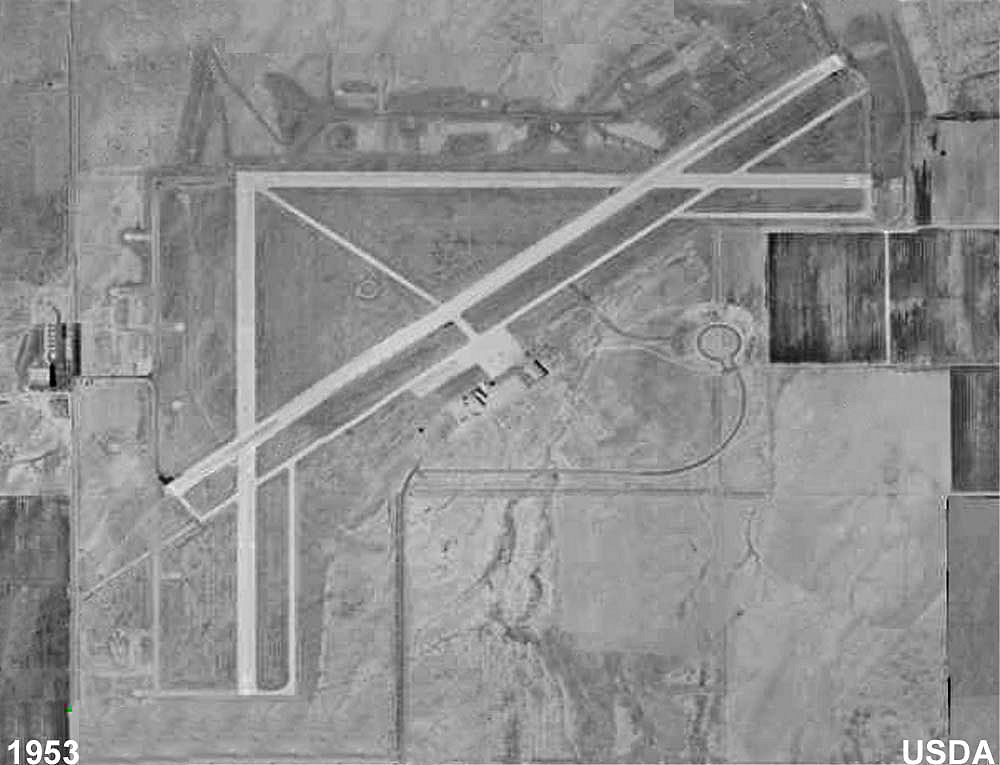
Palmdale Airport in 1953, showing its World War II configuration

The origins of Palmdale Regional Airport go to the early 1930s, when a small airstrip was built in the desert. It was listed in 1935 documentation as CAA Intermediate #5. It was established by the Bureau of Air Commerce (later the Civil Aeronautics Administration) who maintained a network of emergency landing fields. It provided a pilot in distress with a better alternative than landing on a public road or a farmer's field.

=== World War II ===
In 1940, Palmdale Army Airfield was activated as a United States Army Air Corps (later Air Forces) airfield for use as an emergency landing strip and for B-25 Mitchell medium bomber support training during World War II. It was one of many intermediate fields that were used as auxiliary fields or emergency landing fields by the AAF during World War II. Their dispersion along the air routes, their infrequent use, and their U.S. government ownership made them ideal for use by military aircraft. It acted as a sub-base for Muroc Army Airfield and Hammer Army Airfield.

=== Postwar use ===
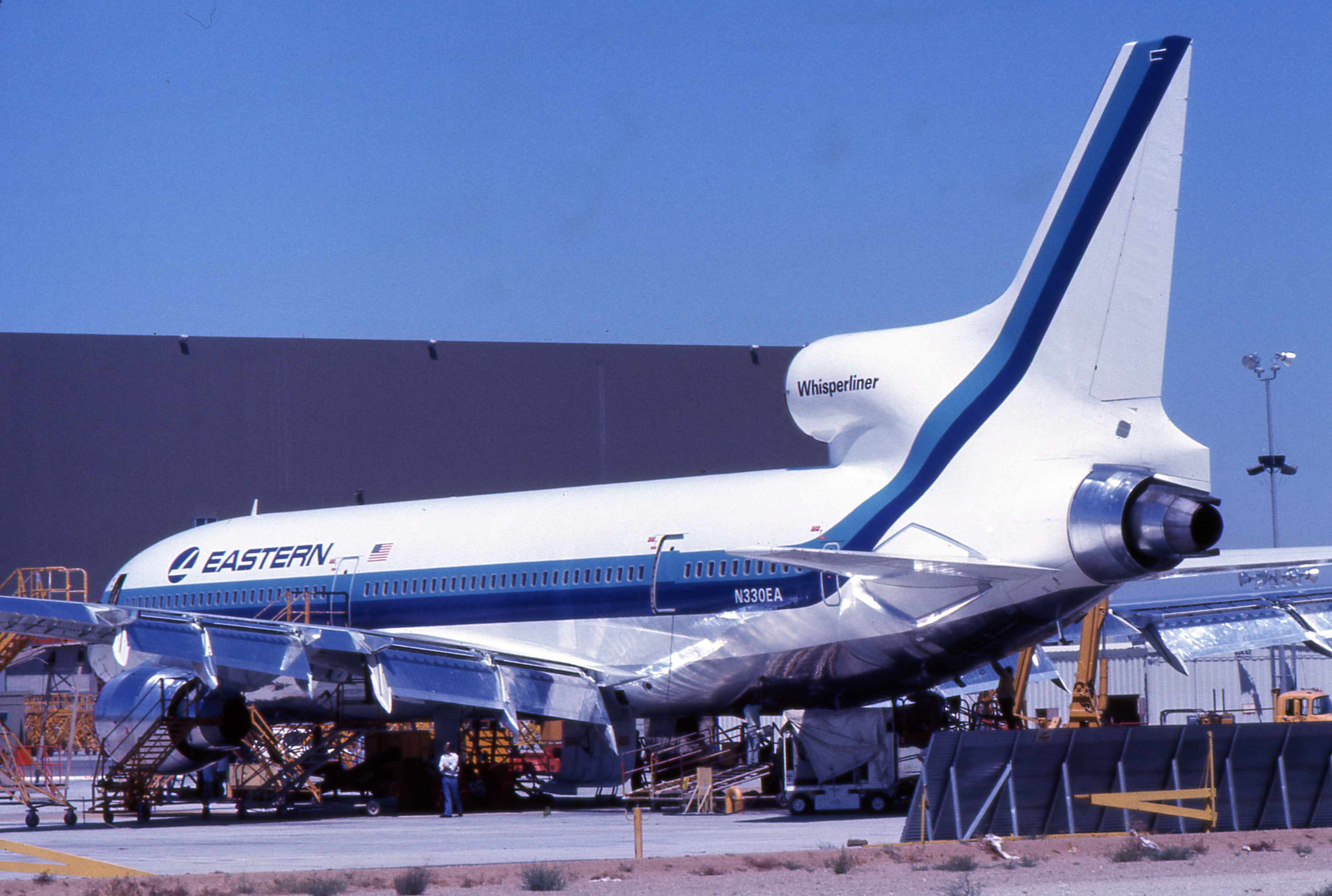
Eastern Air Lines TriStar at Palmdale Regional Airport in 1974 ahead of delivery to the airline. Palmdale was once the manufacture site of this aircraft type.

Palmdale Army Airfield was declared a surplus facility in 1946 and was purchased by Los Angeles County for use as a municipal airport. The outbreak of the Korean War in 1950 caused the Air Force to reactivate the property for use in final assembly and flight testing of military jet aircraft.

Both the Air Force and its aircraft contractors needed a location away from major population centers - due to sonic booms, other noises and security concerns - but close enough to the major centers of aircraft design and production, while having excellent flying weather the year around. The land that became Plant 42 fit these criteria. Consequently, the Air Force agreed to purchase the land from Los Angeles County in 1951.

Lockheed assembled 250 new TriStar wide body jetliners at their manufacturing plant located at the airport from 1968 to 1984. The first L-1011 TriStars entered service with both Trans World Airlines and Eastern Air Lines in 1972.

=== Past airline service ===
From 1970 to 1983 the Los Angeles Department of Airports, now called Los Angeles World Airports (LAWA), acquired about 17,750 acres (72 km^{2}) of land east and south of United States Air Force Plant 42 in unincorporated Los Angeles County to be developed into the future "Palmdale Intercontinental Airport," an alternative to LAX. LAWA has not developed its Palmdale airport land beyond the small airport terminal.

From the late 1960s and early 1980s, commuter air carriers Cable Commuter Airlines followed by successor Golden West Airlines operated de Havilland Canada DHC-6 Twin Otter turboprop service from the airport with several nonstop flights a day to Los Angeles (LAX). By 1983, Mojave Airlines was operating several nonstop flights a day to LAX with Beechcraft C99 commuter turboprops.

In 1989, LAWA and the U.S. Air Force came to an agreement concerning use of the Plant 42 complex's facilities and land for commercial use. The agreement allows a maximum of 400 flights per day.

In 1990, America West Airlines was operating nonstop service to Las Vegas and Phoenix with de Havilland Canada DHC-8 Dash 8 turboprops. However, this America West service lasted less than a year. Also during the 1990s, several commuter airlines used the Palmdale Regional Airport passenger terminal sited on Plant 42. These air carriers included SkyWest Airlines operating as the Delta Connection flying Fairchild Swearingen Metroliner propjets nonstop to LAX in the early 1990s and Mesa Airlines operating as United Express flying Beechcraft 1900C turboprops to LAX in the mid 1990s. Both airlines operated up to six round trip flights a day between the airport and LAX before ceasing all service. This civilian terminal was unused from 1998 to 2004.

In March 2001, Los Angeles County hired Tri-Star Marketing to prepare the presentations needed to bring air-passenger service back to Palmdale Regional Airport.

On December 29, 2004, civilian use resumed when Scenic Airlines began scheduled service to North Las Vegas, Nevada, although that service officially terminated in January 2006.

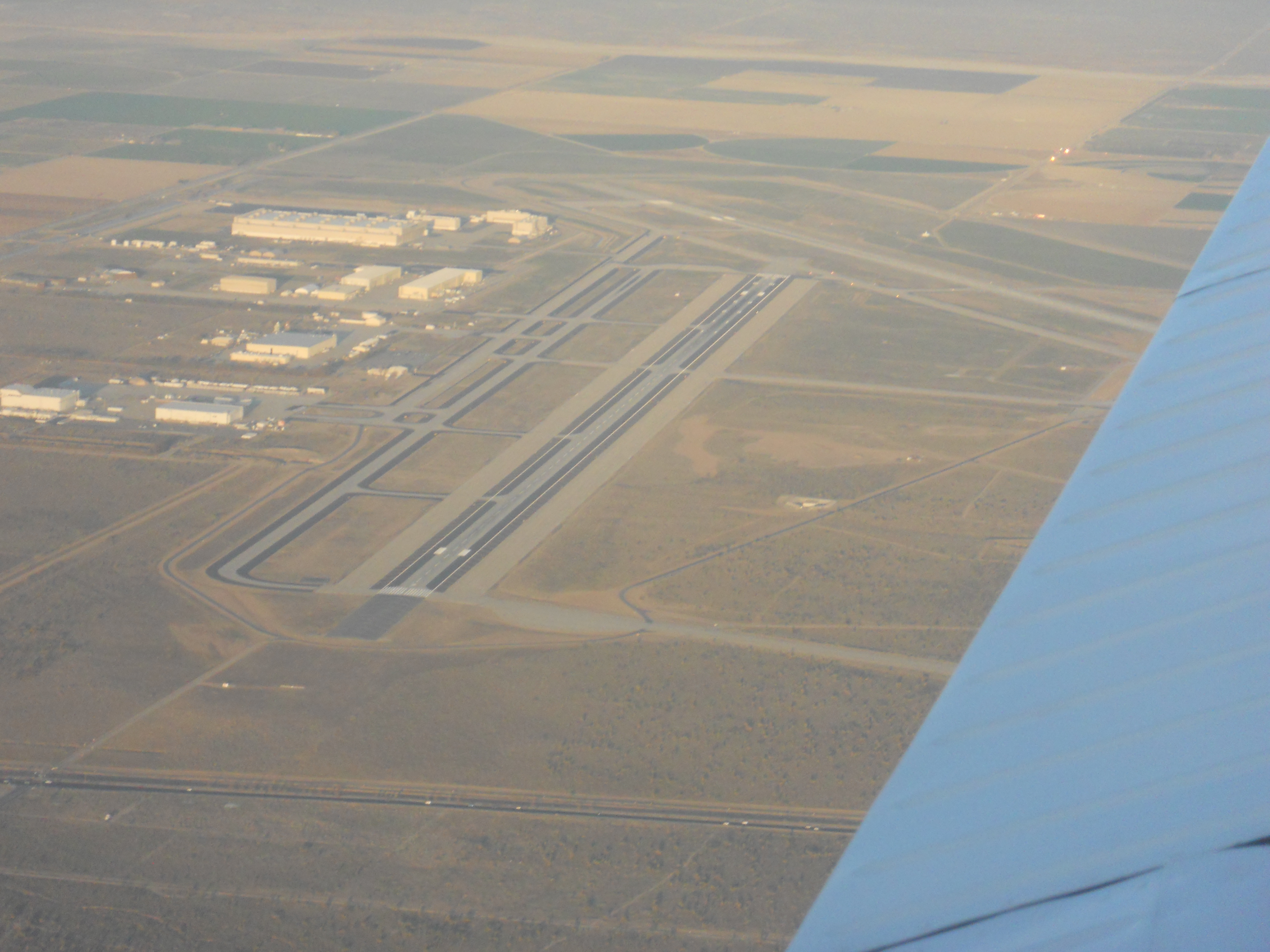
Looking down runway 7 from about 6000 feet AGL in 2007

In January 2007, subsidies valued at $4.6 million, with $2 million slated to underwrite losses incurred from providing airline service, were raised to restore commercial service to the airport. The incentive package included a $900,000 grant from the federal government to the city of Palmdale to develop regional airport service. The terminal was remodeled and reopened in May 2007. Convincing airlines of the marketability of the airport without subsidies has been difficult. The communities around LAX and Burbank do not want the noise of additional flights, but most Antelope Valley residents support expanding service at Palmdale.

In February 2007, the city of Palmdale and LAWA selected United Airlines to provide service between Palmdale and San Francisco International Airport (SFO). (The only other proposal was from Delta Air Lines to Salt Lake City). The United Express flights operated by SkyWest Airlines offered twice-daily, Canadair CRJ-200 regional jet service beginning on June 7, 2007. Between June 7 and December 31, 2007, the airport served 12,022 passengers, about 58 per day. On September 3, 2008, the San Francisco United Express service operated by SkyWest Airlines was increased from two 50-seat regional jets a day to four 30-seat Embraer EMB-120 Brasilia turboprop flights per day. On its September 18 schedule update, United canceled all flights beginning December 7, 2008, the day after the expiration of the federal grant and 18 months after the beginning of the SFO-PMD services. United's service was the last scheduled airline service at the airport.

The airport was included in the National Plan of Integrated Airport Systems for 2011–2015, which categorized it as a primary commercial service facility based on enplanements in 2008 (more than 10,000 per year). The airport had 10,392 passenger boardings (enplanements) in calendar year 2008, 82% more than the 5,712 in 2007.

In late 2008, the city of Palmdale expressed interest in assuming operations at Palmdale Airport, including management of the terminal, taxiways, and parking, from LAWA. LAWA indicated that it was receptive to transferring the lease. The city took over the airport at the end of 2013, managing it via the Palmdale Airport Authority. In 2019, the city contracted with outside consultants to develop a new passenger terminal on city property, which was intended to serve the needs of defense contractors based at Plant 42 and Edwards Air Force Base. As of August 2022, these plans were awaiting approval by the Air Force, which needed to sign a joint use agreement before site development could begin.

== Popular culture ==
A terminal building set was built within a disused hangar at the airport for filming use during production of the 2004 film The Terminal. Around 40 national chains volunteered to build replicas of their shopping outlets on site, in order to take advantage of screen exposure in the Steven Spielberg film.

The hangar space was used again to stage the sea battle scene in the 2007 film Pirates Of The Caribbean: At World’s End.

== See also ==
- List of airports in California
