= Salt Lake City Air Route Traffic Control Center =

Coordinates: 40.7861°N 111.9523°W

Salt Lake City Air Route Traffic Control Center (ZLC) (radio communications "Salt Lake Center") is one of 22 FAA Area Control Centers in the United States. It is located in Salt Lake City, Utah, adjacent to Salt Lake City International Airport. It was opened in 1939 and was originally located on the third floor of the old Salt Lake City International Airport terminal. Salt Lake Center (ZLC) covers one of the largest geographical areas of any control center, totaling approximately 350,000 squares miles. It is the 18th busiest ARTCC in the United States. It covers the airspace of much of Idaho, Montana, Nevada, and Utah, western half of Wyoming, eastern portion of Oregon, and small portions of North Dakota and South Dakota. In 2024, Salt Lake Center handled 1,566,700 aircraft.

The primary responsibility of Salt Lake Center is sequencing and separation of over-flights, arrivals, and departures in order to provide safe, orderly, and expeditious flow of aircraft flying under instrument flight rules (IFR).
