= United States Air Force Plant 42 =

United States Air Force-owned aircraft manufacturing facility in Palmdale, California

- Part of the Air Force Materiel Command (AFMC)
- Located near Palmdale, California in the United States
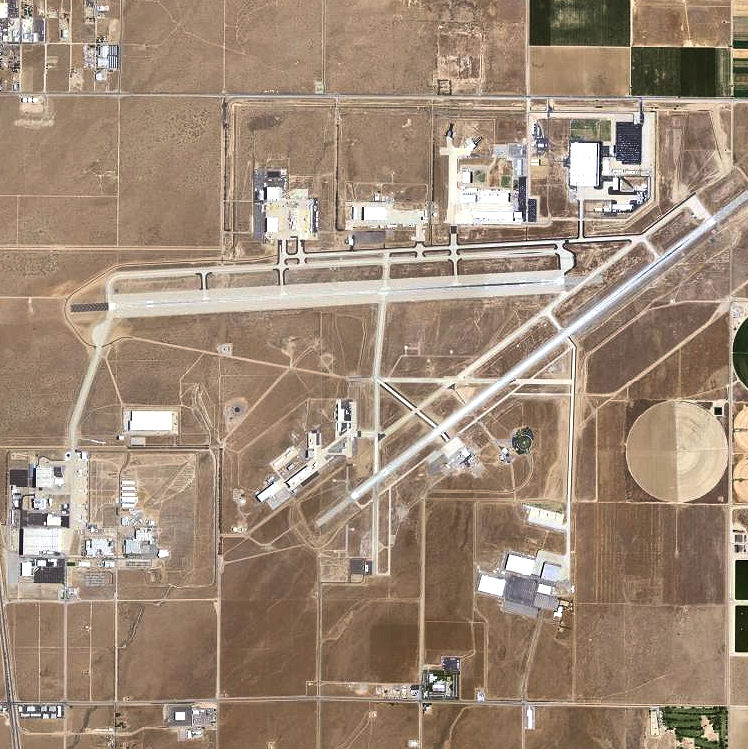
- USGS aerial image of United States Air Force Plant 42

Site information
- Type: United States government manufacturing facility
- Owner: United States Air Force
- Operator: United States Department of Defense
- Condition: Operational

Location
- Location within the Los Angeles metropolitan area Location within California Location within the United States
- Coordinates: 34°37′43″N 118°05′04″W
- Area: 5,832 acres (2,360 ha)

Site history
- Built: 1935–1956
- Built by: Civil Aeronautics Administration / United States Air Force
- In use: 1935–present

Garrison information
- Current commander: Dr. David Smith
- Garrison: 412th Test Wing Operating Location, Air Force Test Center
- Occupants: Air Force Materiel Command

Airfield information
- Identifiers: IATA: PMD, ICAO: KPMD, FAA LID: PMD, WMO: 72382
- Elevation: 2,542 feet (775 m) AMSL
Runways
| Direction | Length and surface |
|---|---|
| 04/22 | 12,001 feet (3,658 m) Concrete |
| 07/25 | 12,002 feet (3,658 m) Concrete |
| 072/252 | 6,000 feet (1,829 m) Concrete |
- Sources: Federal Aviation Administration

United States Air Force Plant 42 (IATA: PMD, ICAO: KPMD, FAA LID: PMD) is a classified aircraft manufacturing plant owned by the United States Air Force in the Antelope Valley, about 60 miles (100 kilometers) from downtown Los Angeles. It is also used by the National Aeronautics and Space Administration (NASA).

Plant 42 shares a runway with Palmdale Regional Airport (PMD).

== Overview ==
Plant 42 is owned by the United States Air Force and operated as a component of Edwards Air Force Base, which is 23 mi (37 km) northeast. Most of its facilities are operated by private contractors to build and maintain military aircraft and their components for the United States and its allies.

Plant 42 has 3,200,000 square feet (300,000 m^{2}) of industrial space and a replacement value of $1.1 billion. Some of its facilities build aircraft, including the Northrop Grumman RQ-4 Global Hawk and other unmanned aircraft. Others maintain and modify aircraft such as the Northrop Grumman B-2 Spirit bomber. Still others make spare parts.

Aerospace contractors at Air Force Plant 42 share a runway complex, and either lease building space from the Air Force (an arrangement commonly referred to as a "GOCO", or government-owned, contractor-operated) or own their own buildings outright (e.g., Lockheed Martin Skunk Works). There are eight production sites specially suited for advanced technology and/or "black" programs. Currently, the most well-known contractors at Plant 42 are Boeing, Lockheed Martin, and Northrop Grumman. Previously, the facilities were operated by IT&T; McDonnell-Douglas Aircraft; Lockheed California; Norair, a division of Northrop; and Lockheed Air Terminal.

Plant 42 is a GOCO, contractually operated for the Air Force since 1954. But under the Obama administration, the Air Force chose to take over some plant operations that had long been performed by contractors. The airfield is now operated by the Department of Defense, with 412th Test Wing/Operating Location, Air Force Test Center in command.

Plant 42 controls more than 5,800 acres (23 km^{2}) of Mojave Desert land north of Avenue P and south of Columbia Way (Avenue M). The western border is Sierra Highway, and the plant extends east to around 40th Street East, south of Avenue N to Avenue P, and 50th Street East north of Avenue N to Columbia Way (Avenue M).

It is the Antelope Valley's second-largest employer.

== Facilities ==
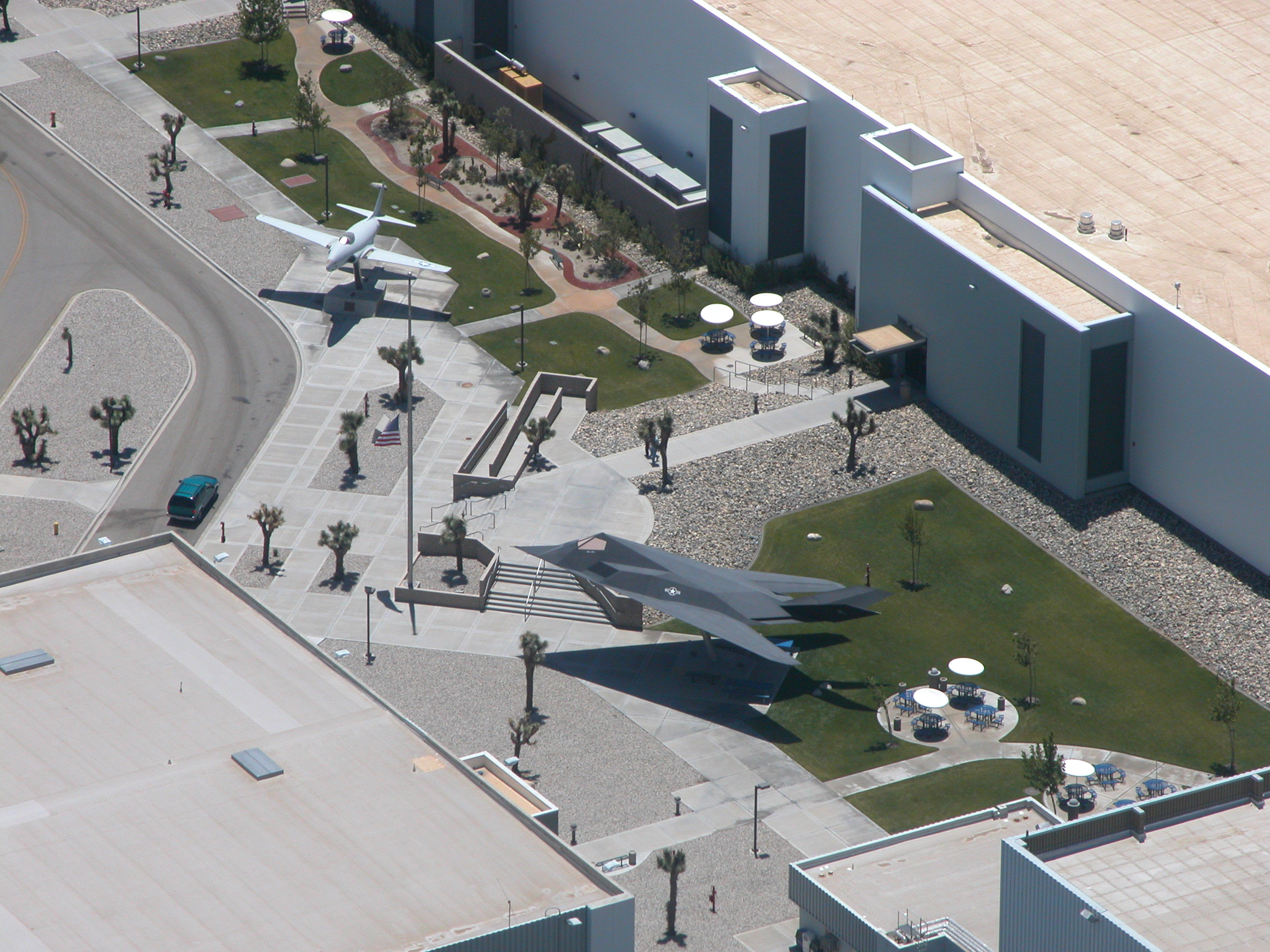
Entrance plaza of the Lockheed Skunk Works

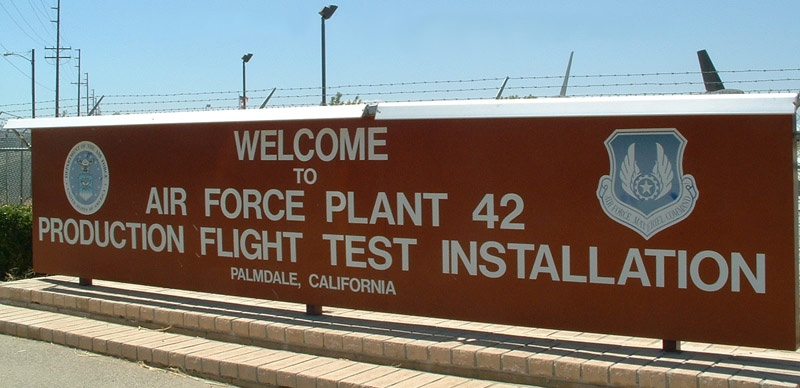
Sign by one of the gates into Plant 42

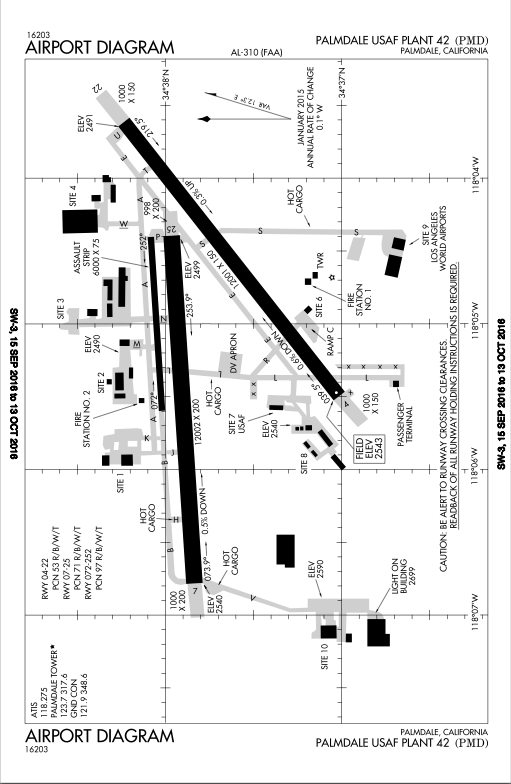
FAA airport diagram of Plant 42

Northrop Grumman's B-2 final assembly and modification facility is at Palmdale. In February 1999, Department of Defense officials said that depot support for the B-2 would be provided by commercial and military sources. For example, the engines are to be maintained by the Air Force, software support is to be provided by commercial sources, and airframe maintenance is to be provided by Northrop Grumman at Palmdale.

Rockwell's Palmdale assembly facility is where all the individual parts, pieces, and systems of the Space Shuttle came together and were assembled and tested. Upon completion, the spacecraft was turned over to NASA for truck transport to Edwards AFB. NASA's Dryden Flight Research Facility at Edwards Air Force Base was where the spacecraft was loaded and unloaded on a Shuttle Carrier Aircraft.

About 250 major subcontractors supplied various systems and components to Rockwell's Palmdale assembly facility. The structures of the orbiter were manufactured at various companies under contract to Rockwell International's Space Transportation Systems Division, Downey, California. The upper and lower forward fuselage, crew compartment, forward reaction control system and aft fuselage were manufactured at Rockwell's Space Transportation Systems Division facility in Downey and were transported overland from Downey to Rockwell's Palmdale, California, assembly facility. The midfuselage was manufactured by General Dynamics, San Diego, California, and transported overland to Rockwell's Palmdale assembly facility. The wings (including elevons) were manufactured by Grumman, Bethpage, Long Island, New York, and transported by ship from New York via the Panama Canal to Long Beach, California, and then transported overland to Rockwell's Palmdale assembly facility. The vertical tail (including rudder/speed brake) were manufactured by Fairchild Republic in Farmingdale, Long Island, New York, and transported overland to Rockwell's Palmdale assembly facility. The payload bay doors were manufactured at Rockwell International's Tulsa, Oklahoma, facility and transported overland to Rockwell's Palmdale assembly facility. The body flap was manufactured at Rockwell International's Columbus, Ohio, facility and transported overland to Rockwell's Palmdale assembly facility. The aft orbital maneuvering system/reaction control system pods were manufactured by McDonnell Douglas, St. Louis, Missouri, and transported by aircraft to Rockwell's Palmdale assembly facility. They were also transported by aircraft from Rockwell's Palmdale assembly facility to the Kennedy Space Center.

The National Aeronautics and Space Administration had been paying the Air Force for use of Plant 42 facilities for the shuttle work. NASA decided in February 2002 to shift space shuttle overhaul and modification work from Palmdale to Florida. On August 7, 2020, J G Contracting of Nipomo, California, received a contract for maintenance, repair, and construction at U.S. Air Force facilities at Plant 42. On August 31, 2021, KAL Architects of Irvine, California, received a five-year contract for architect and engineering services at Plant 42.

Current known projects include design, engineering, pre-production, production, modification, flight testing, servicing and repair mission related activities to the following:

- B-2 Spirit
- B-21 Raider
- B-52 Stratofortress
- F-22 Raptor
- F-35 Lightning II (JSF)
- MQ-4C Triton
- RQ-4 Global Hawk
- RQ-170 Sentinel
- SOFIA (Stratospheric Observatory for infrared Astronomy) - NASA 747SP
- U-2 "Dragon Lady"
- X-47B

== Museums ==
Two museums are located adjacent to Plant 42: the Blackbird Airpark Museum and the Joe Davies Heritage Airpark. The Blackbird Airpark Museum displays 4 Cold War-era reconnaissance aircraft which were developed by the Lockheed Corporation, while the Joe Davies Heritage Airpark displays 22 aircraft from multiple manufacturers which were designed, built, and flown at Plant 42.

== History ==
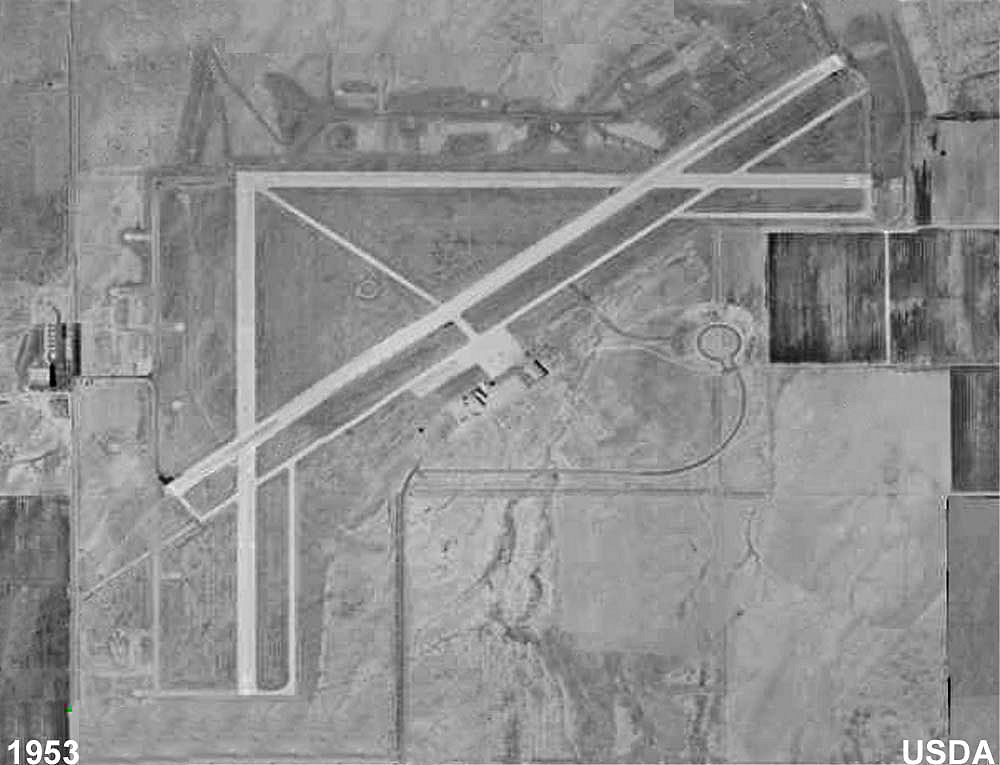
Palmdale Airport in 1953, showing its World War II configuration

The origins of Plant 42 go to the early 1930s, when a small airstrip was built in the desert. It was listed in 1935 documentation as CAA Intermediate #5. It was established by the Bureau of Air Commerce (later the Civil Aeronautics Administration) who maintained a network of emergency landing fields. It provided a pilot in distress with a better alternative than landing on a public road or a farmer's field.

=== World War II ===
In 1940, Palmdale Army Airfield was activated as a United States Army Air Corps (later Air Forces) airfield for use as an emergency landing strip and for B-25 Mitchell medium bomber support training during World War II. It was one of many intermediate fields that were used as auxiliary fields or emergency landing fields by the AAF during World War II. Their dispersion along the air routes, their infrequent use, and their U.S. government ownership made them ideal for use by military aircraft. It acted as a sub-base for Muroc Army Airfield and Hammer Army Airfield.

=== Postwar use ===
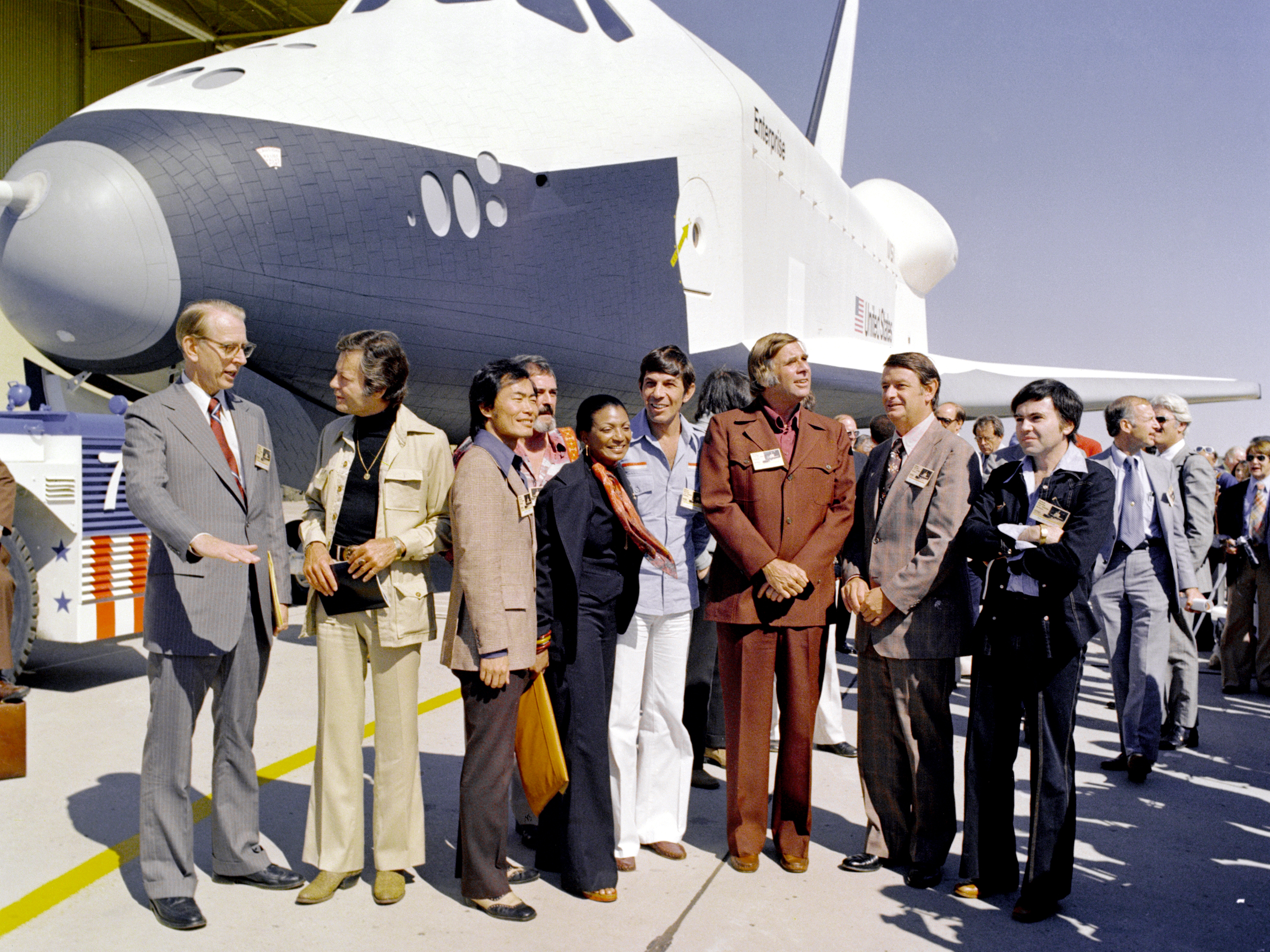
The Space Shuttle Enterprise rolls out of the Palmdale manufacturing facilities with Star Trek cast and crew members in September 1976.

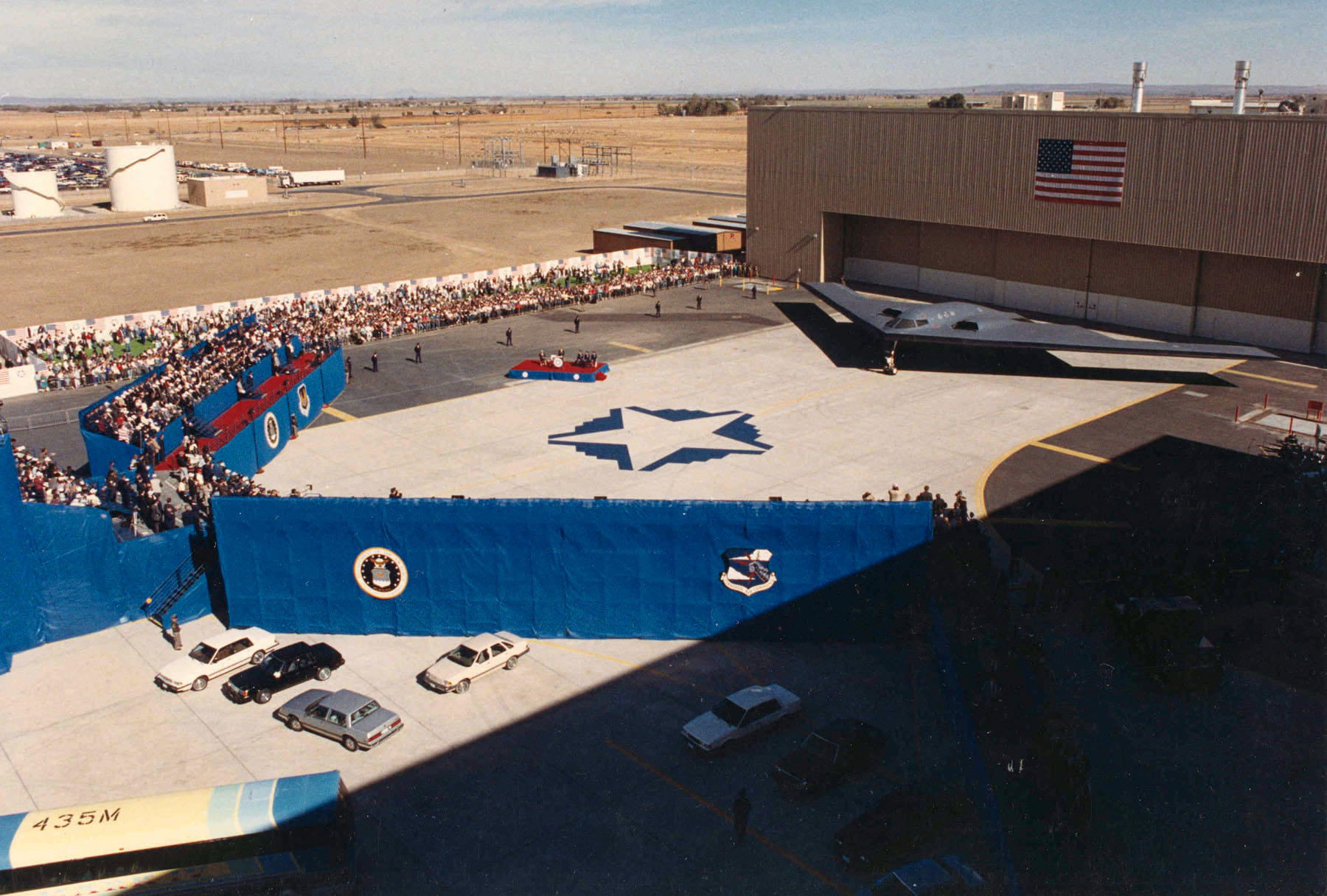
Northrop B-2A roll-out ceremony on November 22, 1988, at USAF Plant 42

Palmdale Army Airfield was declared a surplus facility in 1946 and was purchased by Los Angeles County for use as a municipal airport. The outbreak of the Korean War in 1950 caused the Air Force to reactivate the property for use in final assembly and flight testing of military jet aircraft.

Both the Air Force and its aircraft contractors needed a location away from major population centers - due to sonic booms, other noises and security concerns - but close enough to the major centers of aircraft design and production, while having excellent flying weather the year around. The land which became Plant 42 fit these criteria. Consequently, the Air Force agreed to purchase the land from Los Angeles County in 1951.

The Air Force awarded a contract to Lockheed Aircraft to develop the master plan for the site. The plan was to construct a facility that would meet the requirements of full war mobilization and augment the industrial production potential of the major airframe manufacturing industry in southern California.

The concept for Air Force Plant 42 originated in the challenge of flight testing high performance jet aircraft over heavily populated areas. Following approval of the Master Plan in 1953, the Palmdale Airport officially became Air Force Plant 42; ownership of the installation was transferred to the Federal Government in 1954.

With USAF encouragement, Lockheed, looked upon with favor by the Air Force at this time, established its permanent presence at Plant 42. It signed a lease in 1956 for 237 acres to use Palmdale Airport for final assembly and flight testing.

=== Lockheed Skunk Works ===
Lockheed's famed "Skunk Works" (a corporate division tasked with clandestine development of black projects), which developed such aircraft as the U-2, SR-71 Blackbird and F-117 Nighthawk, is at Site 10 of the complex (actually private property with secure access to Plant 42's airfield), near Sierra Highway. It relocated to Plant 42 from its original Burbank-Glendale-Pasadena Airport (now Bob Hope Airport) site in Burbank after the end of the Cold War. Its present hangar was constructed in 1968 and the outer walls of the structure were put up in a matter of days. Its hangar originally was built for the Lockheed L-1011 Tristar passenger jet project.

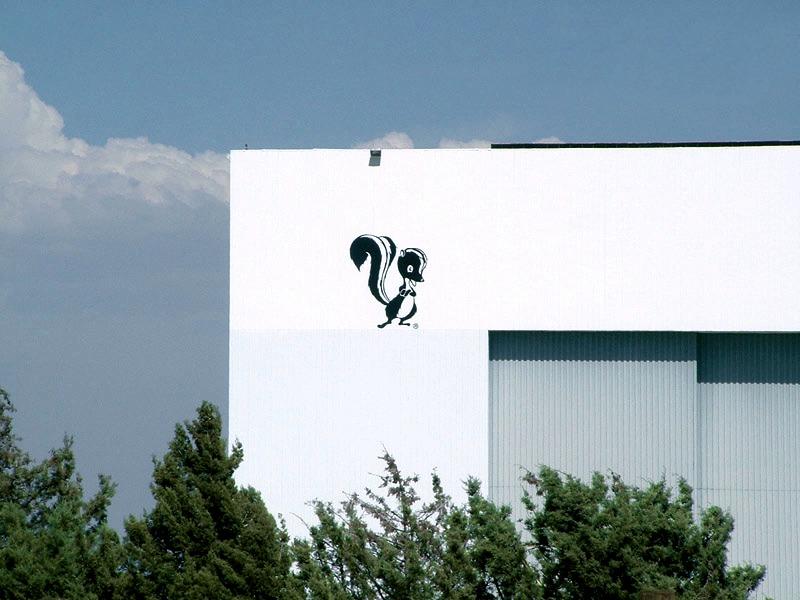
Skunkworks logo on hangar at Plant 42.

Since then, the plant has supported facilities for the production, engineering, final assembly and flight testing of high performance aircraft. During the 1980s it was used by Lockheed to produce the U-2/TR-1 and support the SR-71. Northrop produced the F-5E, and Rockwell supported the B-1B Lancer. Past projects included:

- Each of the Space Shuttle orbiters
- Modernization of the Space Shuttle Columbia's cockpit area
- Lockheed L-1011 Tristar passenger jet
- B-1 Lancer Bomber
- XB-70 Valkyrie
- X-15
- SR-71 Blackbird
- F-117A Nighthawk

== Gallery ==
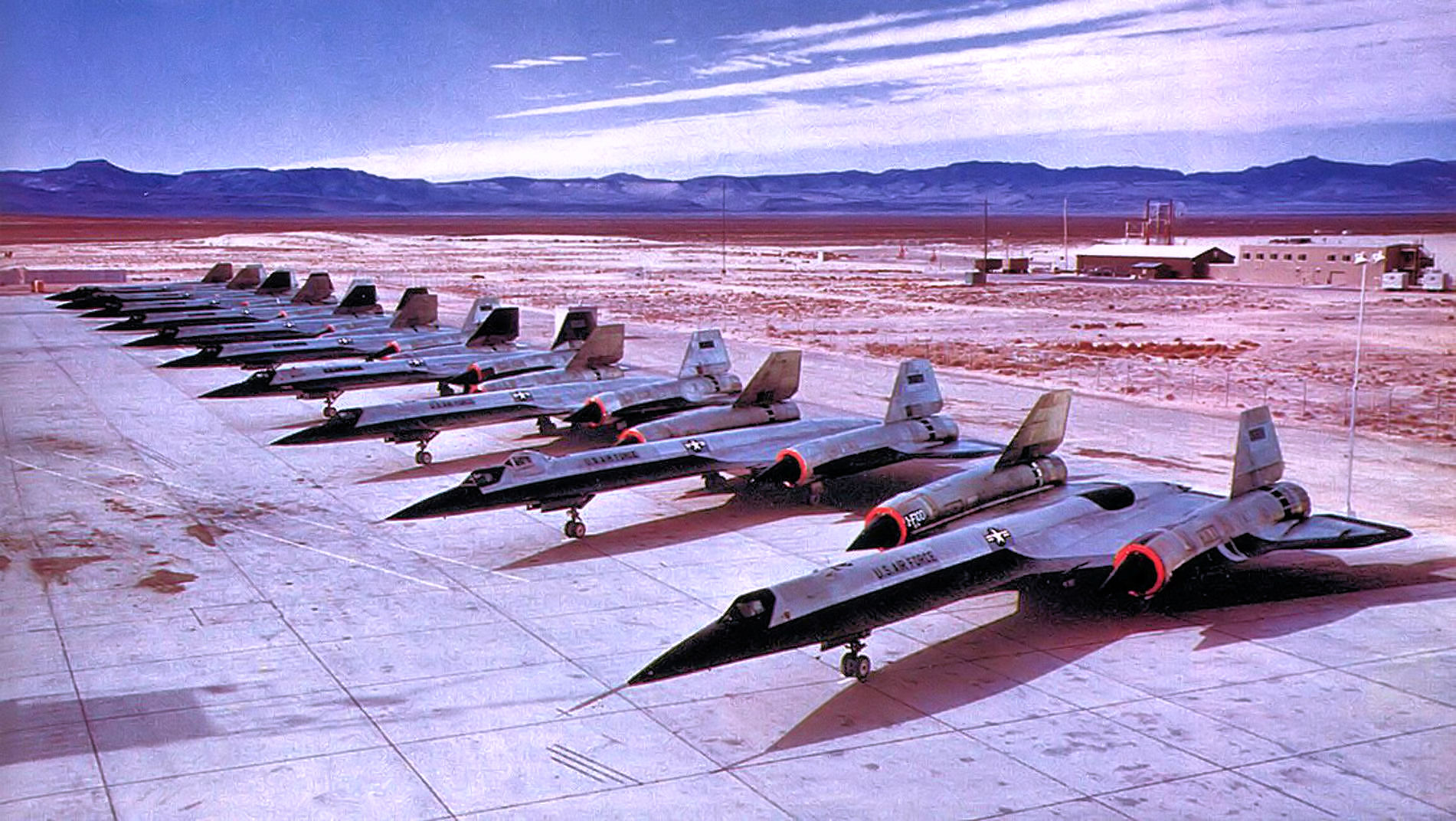
Lockheed A-12s at Plant 42.

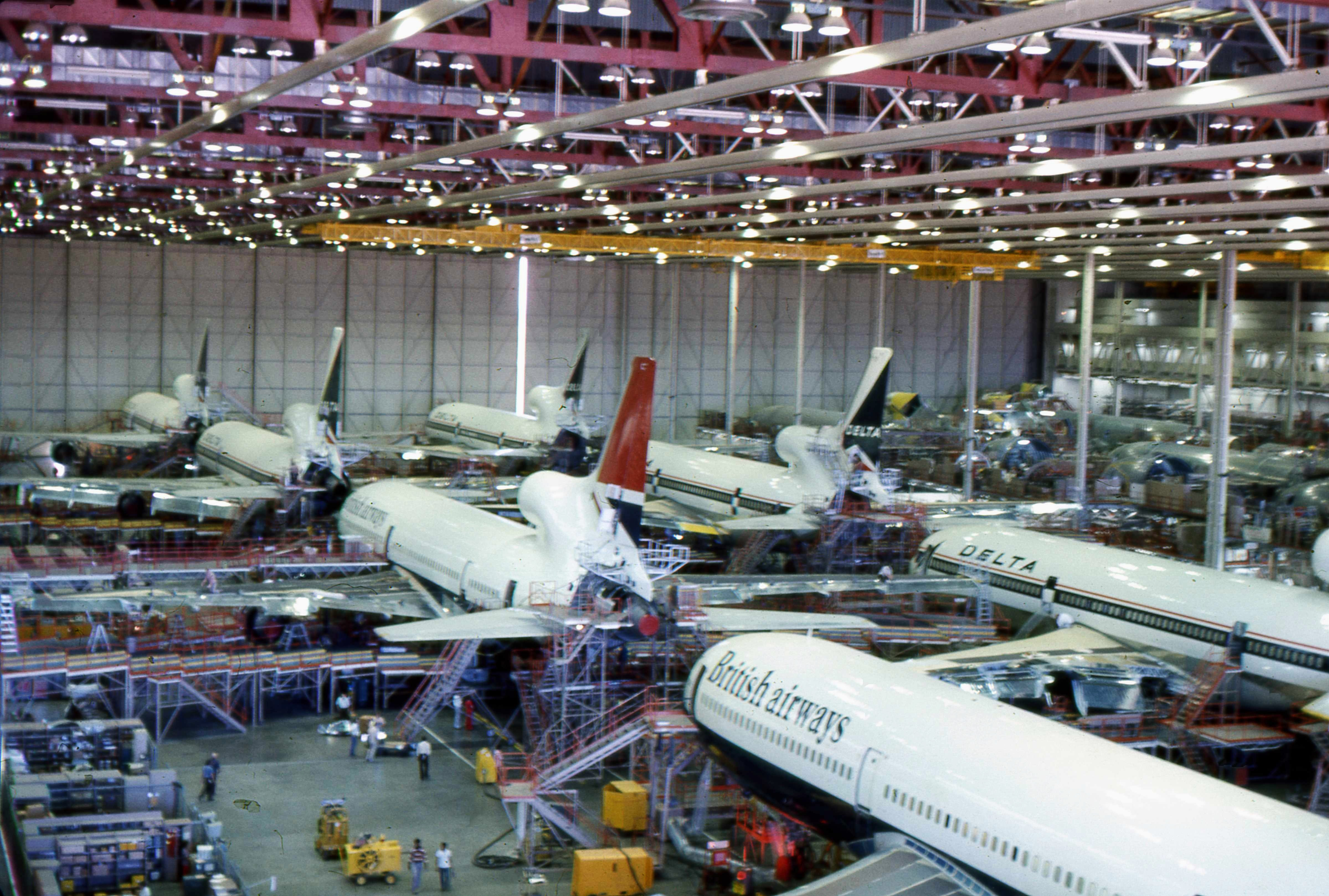
L-1011 production within the large hangar at the Lockheed site, 1974.

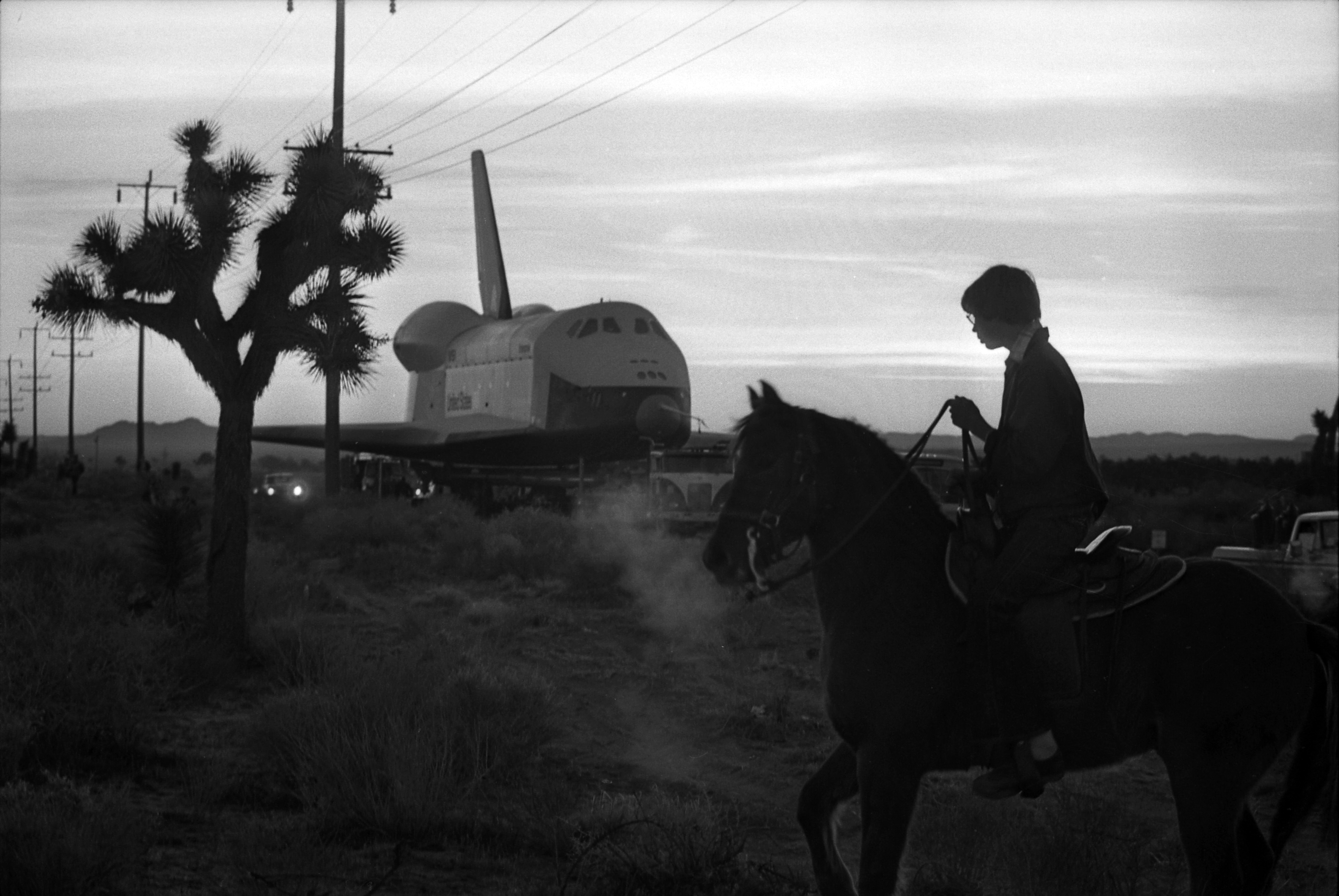
Space Shuttle Enterprise being towed from the Rockwell International facility in Palmdale, 1977.

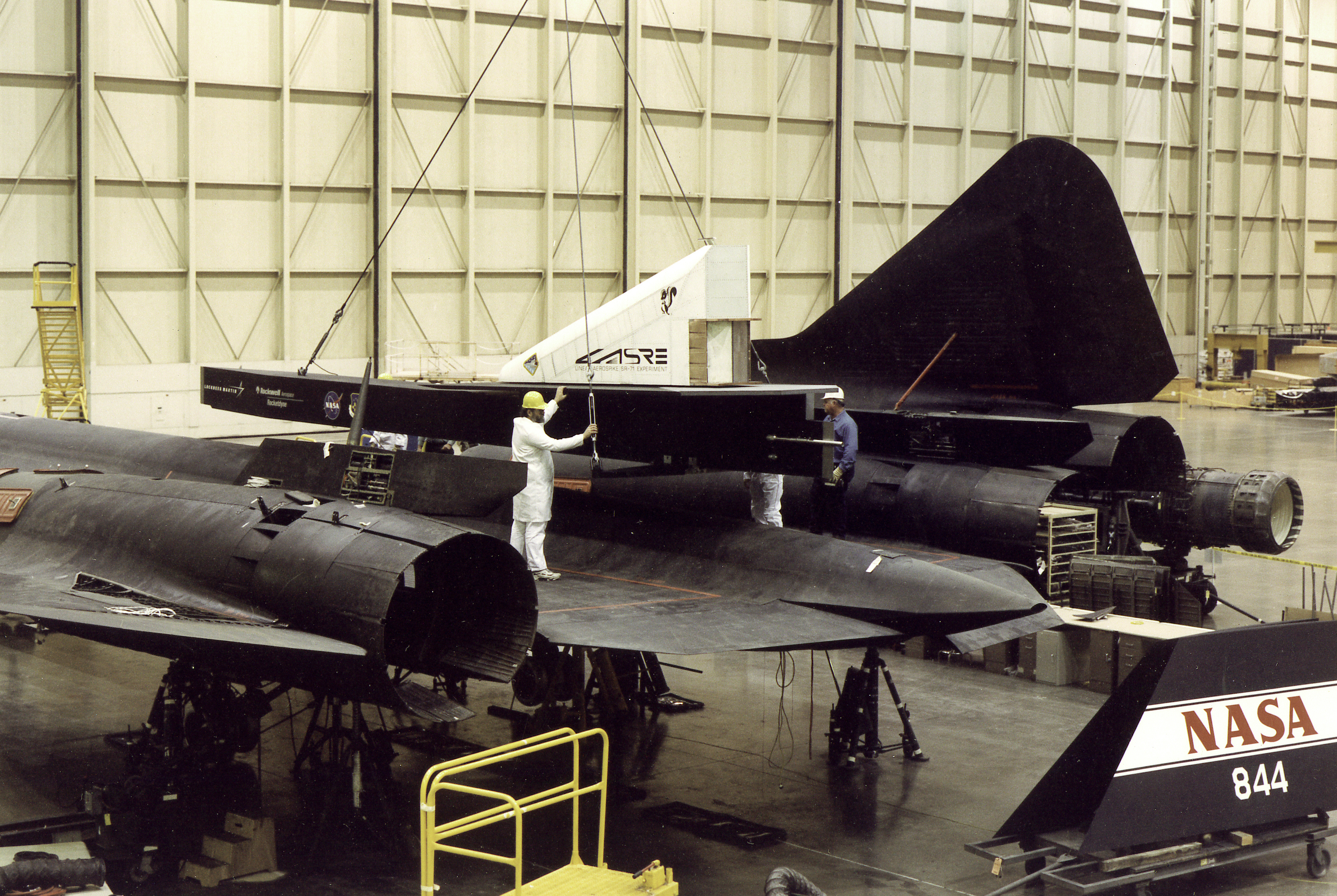
Linear Aerospike SR Experiment (LASRE) pod placed on NASA SR-71 in 1996, at Lockheed Martin Skunkworks in Palmdale, California.

== See also ==
- Air Force Plant 4, Fort Worth, Texas
- Air Force Plant 6, Marietta, Georgia
- California World War II Army Airfields
