= Jacksonville Air Route Traffic Control Center =

Coordinates: 30.6990°N 81.9082°W

Jacksonville Air Route Traffic Control Center (ZJX), (radio communications, Jacksonville Center) is one of 22 Area Control Centers in the United States. It is located at 37075 Aviation Ln, Hilliard, Florida.

The primary responsibility of Jacksonville Center is sequencing and separation of over-flights, arrivals, and departures in order to provide safe, orderly, and expeditious flow of aircraft filed under instrument flight rules (IFR).

Jacksonville Center is the third busiest ARTCC in the United States. In 2024, Jacksonville Center handled 2,612,869 aircraft.

Jacksonville Center covers approximately 160,000 square miles (410,000 km^{2}) of the Southern United States, including northern Florida (especially Jacksonville metropolitan area and the panhandle), part of South Carolina, southern Georgia, and portions of Alabama. ZJX also covers portions of the Atlantic Ocean and the Gulf of Mexico.

Jacksonville Center lies adjacent to four different Air Route Traffic Control Centers, including Houston Air Route Traffic Control Center, Washington Air Route Traffic Control Center, Atlanta Air Route Traffic Control Center, and Miami Air Route Traffic Control Center. ZJX overlies or abuts several approach control facilities (Jacksonville, Orlando, Daytona Beach, Tampa, Valdosta, Tallahassee, Tyndall, Eglin, Pensacola, Mobile, Cairns, Atlanta, Savannah, Augusta, Beaufort, Charleston, Columbia, Myrtle Beach, Shaw, Florence, Wilmington, Fayetteville, Charlotte).
