= Miami Air Route Traffic Control Center =

United States air route traffic control center

Coordinates: 25.8249°N 80.3193°W

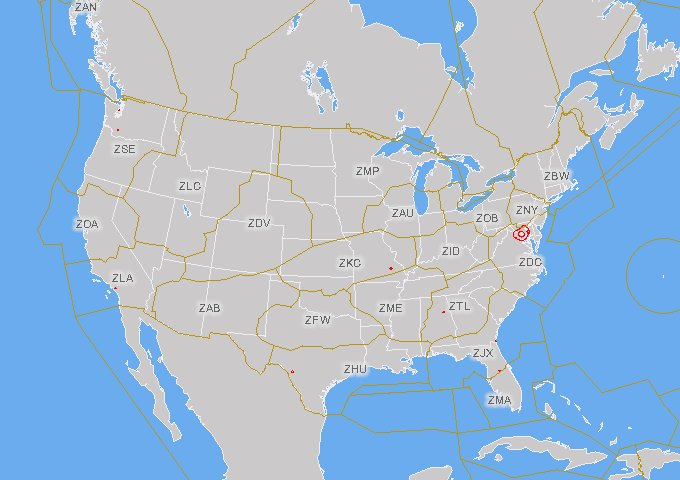
ARTCs of the United States

Miami Air Route Traffic Control Center (ZMA) (radio communications, "Miami Center") is one of 22 United States air route traffic control centers (ARTCs), or area control centers, located at 7500 N.W. 58th st, Miami-Dade County, Florida (Miami postal address).

== Center ==
The primary responsibility of Miami Center is sequencing and separation of over-flights, arrivals, and departures in order to provide safe, orderly, and expeditious flow of aircraft filed under instrument flight rules (IFR).

Miami Center is the second busiest ARTCC in the United States. In 2024, Miami Center handled 2,643,111 aircraft operations. Miami Center covers approximately 22.5 million cubic miles of the Southern United States, including southern Florida (especially Miami metropolitan area), the Atlantic Ocean and the Gulf of Mexico.

Miami Center shares boundaries with Houston Air Route Traffic Control Center, Jacksonville Air Route Traffic Control Center, New York Air Route Traffic Control Center, San Juan Combined En-route Radar Approach Control (CERAP), Turks & Caicos, the Bahamas, the Dominican Republic, Haiti, and Cuba Area Control Centers. ZMA overlies or abuts several approach control facilities (including Miami, Palm Beach, Orlando, Fort Myers, and Tampa approaches).
