= Seattle Air Route Traffic Control Center =

Coordinates: 47.2870°N 122.1882°W

The Seattle Air Route Traffic Control Center (ZSE) (radio communications, "Seattle Center") is the area control center responsible for controlling and ensuring proper separation of IFR aircraft in Washington State, most of Oregon, and parts of Idaho, Montana, Nevada, and California, as well as the neighboring area into the Pacific Ocean. Seattle Center is the 19th busiest of the 22 ARTCCs in the United States. In 2024, Seattle Center handled 1,174,034 aircraft.

The control center is located at 3101 Auburn Way S, Auburn, Washington, which is 11.5 miles (18.5 km) from Seattle–Tacoma International Airport, the only Class B airport served by the center. The center was moved from Sea-Tac to a three-story facility in Auburn in August 1962. The Auburn facility was the first to replace its radar systems with digital displays in 1999.

== Airports served ==
=== Class B ===
- SEA/KSEA Seattle–Tacoma International Airport

=== Class C ===
The following Class C airports in the Seattle ARTCC have continuously operating control towers:

- Fairchild AFB
- Portland International Airport
- Naval Air Station Whidbey Island
- Spokane International Airport

=== Class D ===
The following are Class D airports in the Seattle ARTCC. Those with continuously operating control towers (as opposed to control towers closed during the night) are italicized.

- Bellingham International Airport
- Boeing Field
- Eastern Oregon Regional Airport
- Felts Field
- Grant County International Airport
- Gray AAF (Lewis-McChord AFB)
- Klamath Falls Airport
- Lewiston–Nez Perce County Airport
- Mahlon Sweet/Eugene Airport
- McChord AFB
- McNary/Salem Airport
- Olympia Regional Airport
- Portland-Hillsboro Airport
- Portland-Troutdale Airport
- Renton Municipal Airport
- Roberts Field/Redmond Airport
- Rogue Valley International–Medford Airport
- Paine Field/Snohomish County Airport
- Southwest Oregon Regional Airport
- Tacoma Narrows Airport
- Tri-Cities Airport
- Walla Walla Regional Airport
- Yakima Air Terminal

=== Class E ===
The following airports in the Seattle ARTCC airspace are nontowered, Class E airports:

- Arcata
- Astoria
- Burns
- Hoquiam (Bowerman)
- Bremerton
- Coeur d'Alene (Boyington)
- Deer Park
- Ephrata
- Fairchild Intl
- Crescent City (McNamara)
- Newport
- Wenatchee (Pangborn)
- Pullman–Moscow

== Control area ==
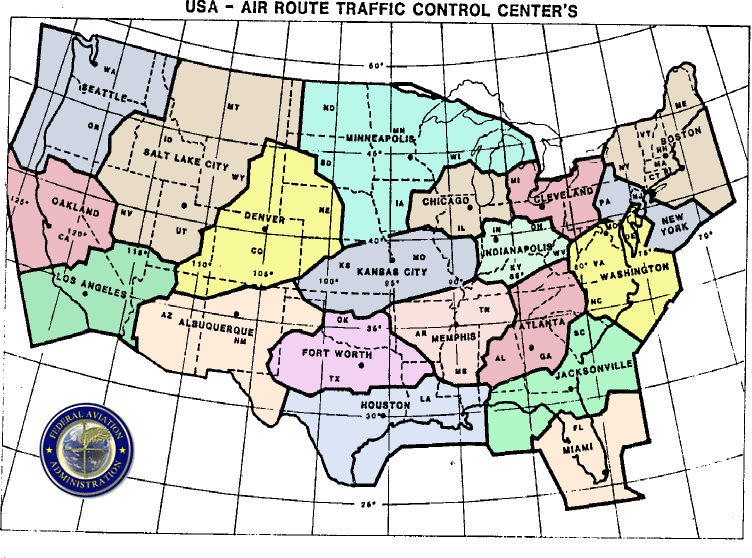
Map of US ARTCCs
