= Buttonville Municipal Airport =

Former airport in Markham, Ontario, Canada (1953–2023)

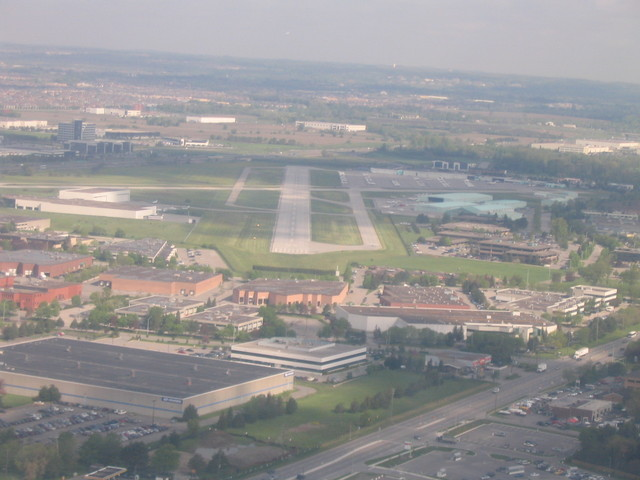
- IATA: YKZ; ICAO: CYKZ; WMO: 71639

Summary
- Airport type: Public
- Operator: Torontair Ltd.
- Location: Markham, Ontario
- Opened: 1953 (as aerodrome); 1962 (as official airport)
- Closed: November 24, 2023
- Time zone: EST (UTC−05:00)
  - Summer (DST): EDT (UTC−04:00)
- Elevation AMSL: 650 ft (200 m)
- Coordinates: 43°51′39″N 079°22′07″W

Map
- Location in Ontario CYKZ (Ontario) CYKZ (Canada)

Runways
Direction	Length		Surface
Direction	ft	m	Surface
03/21	2,694	821	Asphalt (closed)
15/33	3,897	1,188	Asphalt (closed)

Statistics (2018)
- Aircraft movements: 44,067
- Sources: Canada Flight Supplement; Environment Canada; Movements from Statistics Canada

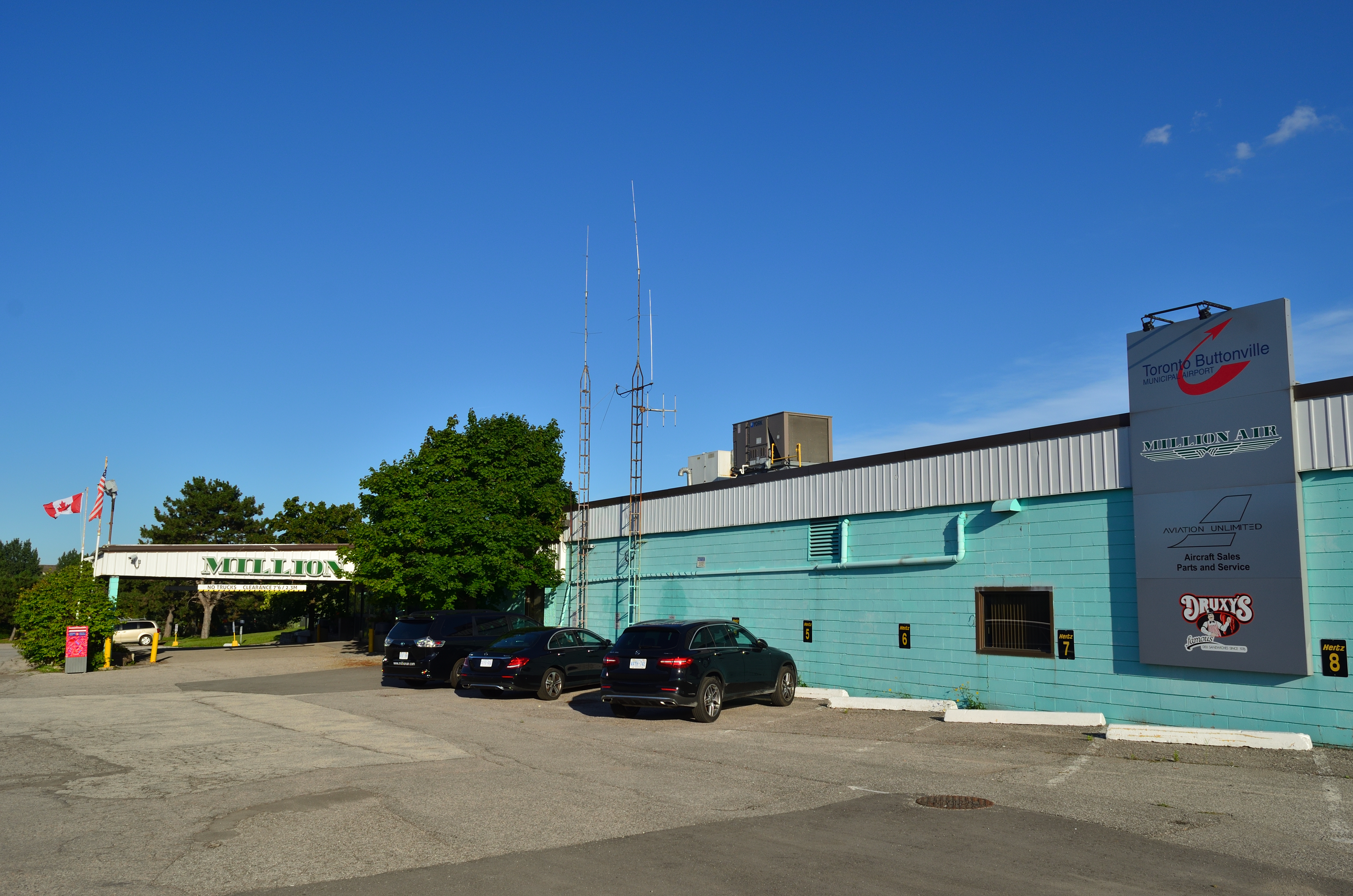
Buttonville Airport main entrance on 16th Avenue

Buttonville Municipal Airport or Toronto/Buttonville Municipal Airport (IATA: YKZ, ICAO: CYKZ) was a medium-sized airport in the neighbourhood of Buttonville in Markham, Ontario, Canada, 29 km (18 mi) north of Downtown Toronto, which closed in November 2023. It was operated by Torontair. Due to its location within Toronto's suburbs, there were several strict noise-reduction procedures for aircraft using the airport, which was open and staffed 24 hours a day, 365 days a year. In 2014, Buttonville was Canada's 20th busiest airport by aircraft movements. There was also a weather station located at the airport, which was still operational on the site but closed along with the airport. A new weather station was installed at Oshawa Executive Airport in nearby Oshawa and was scheduled to be operational on the same day that Buttonville shut down its facility.

The airport was classified as an airport of entry by Nav Canada and was serviced by the Canada Border Services Agency (CBSA) on a call-out basis from Oshawa Executive Airport during weekdays and Billy Bishop Toronto City Airport on the Toronto Islands during weekends. CBSA officers at this airport handled general aviation aircraft only, with no more than 15 passengers.

In May 2023, the airport operators announced plans to close the airport to its tenants, and a NOTAM was issued stating CYKZ was officially closed at 11:00 (EST) on November 24, 2023.

== History ==
Fred F. Gillies was the operator of Buttonville Airport and Gillies Flying Service starting in 1953 until he retired in 1958. Buttonville Airport began to really grow as a grass airstrip in 1953 when Leggat Aviation moved its operations from Barker Field in Toronto. The airstrip became an official airport in 1962.

=== Second air traffic control tower ===
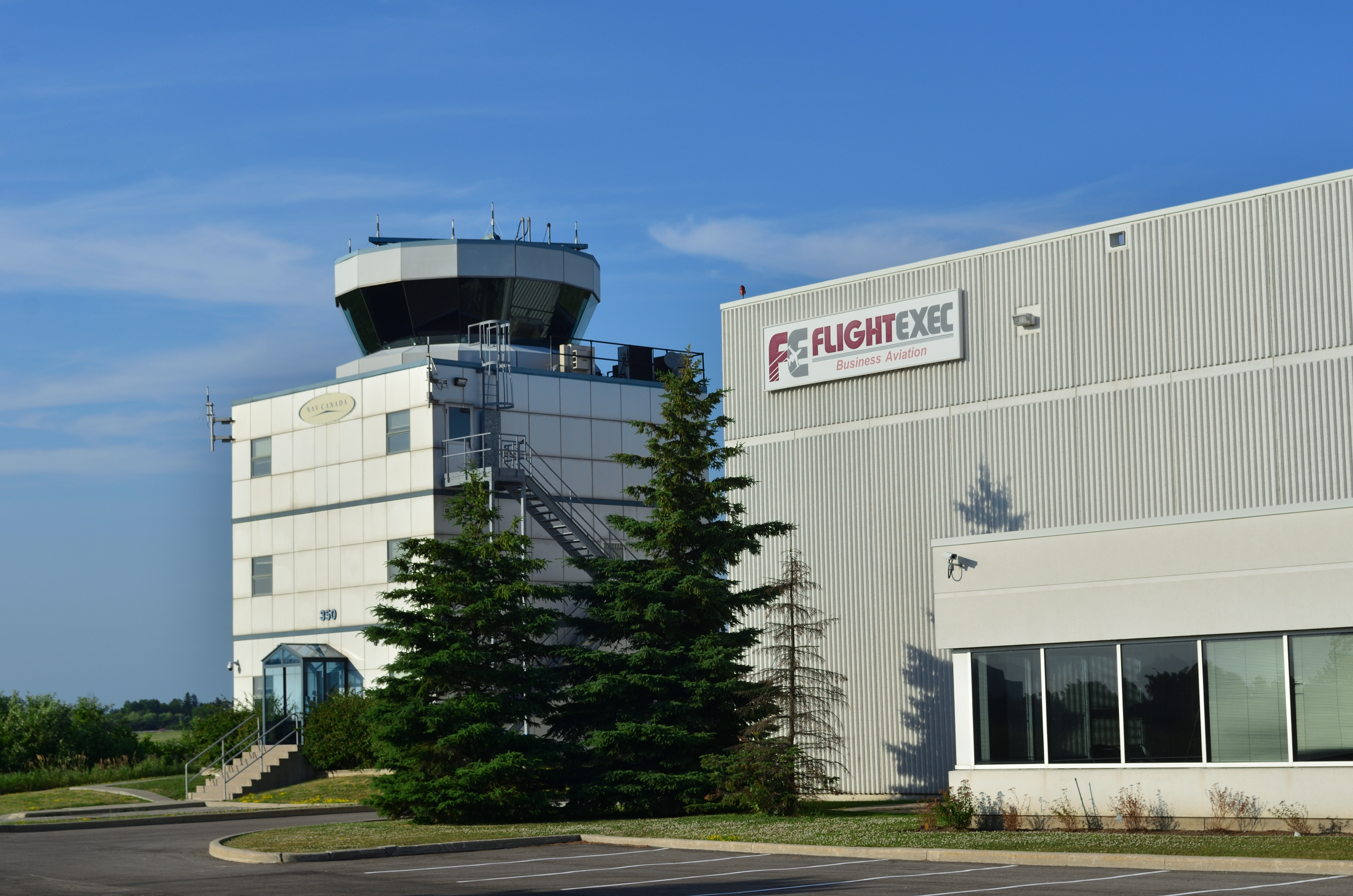
Air traffic control tower on Allstate Parkway

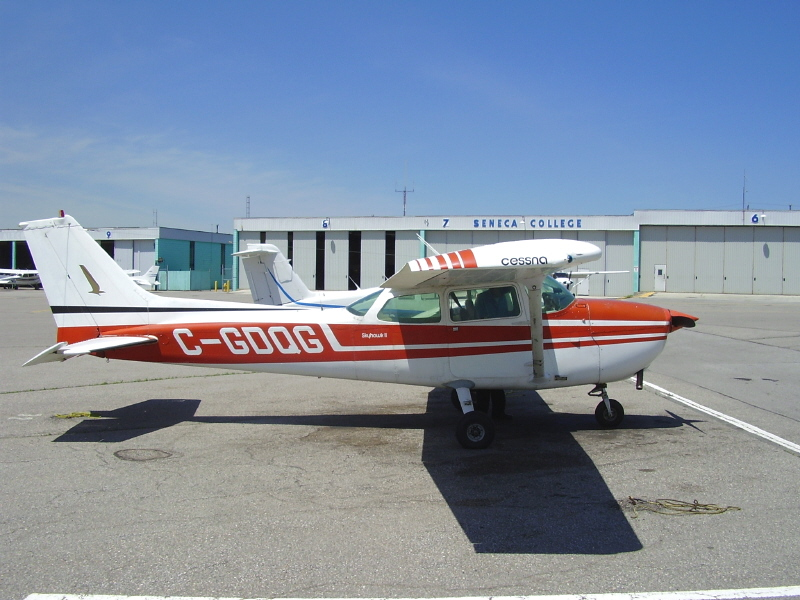
One of 30 training aircraft belonging to the flight school

On January 17, 2006, Nav Canada announced plans for the construction of a new air traffic control tower at Buttonville Airport. It is located at the south end of the now-closed airport next to FlightExec offices on Allstate Parkway.

The new tower, representing an investment of over $2 million, replaced the existing facility, which was built in 1967 and had reached the end of its useful life. Construction began in the fall of 2006 and became fully operational on June 26, 2007. The new tower provided expanded operational space, optimal visibility and the latest in air navigation equipment and technology for 10 air traffic controllers and one support staff who provided service to 84,000 aircraft movements per year at the airport. It is located on the south side of the airport – the opposite side of the old tower. The new tower was designed and built using a modular design enabling the facility to be relocated in the future. New equipment and technology include the Nav Canada Auxiliary Radar Display System and the company's state-of-the-art voice communications switch.

NAV Canada shut down operations of the air traffic control tower on January 3, 2019.

=== Redevelopment plans ===
Buttonville Airport was privately owned, and was threatened with closure due to lack of funds. The Greater Toronto Airports Authority (GTAA) ceased funding the airport causing a $1.5 million loss. The GTAA blamed the decrease of traffic at Pearson Airport for eliminating the subsidy.

In September 2009, the Sifton family, owners of the airport, announced plans to re-develop the airport from 2009 to 2016 into a mixed use of commercial, retail and residential development.

In 2010, a joint real estate venture purchased the 170-acre property on 7 October, with the intention of redeveloping the property by Cadillac Fairview. Plans included condominiums, retail shops, and office space. Due to planning delays, in 2018 Cadillac Fairview announced the site would continue to operate as an airport until at least 2023.

=== Closure ===
On May 31, 2023, the president of Torontair Limited formally notified the tenants of the airport that the Toronto Buttonville Municipal Airport would cease operations on November 30, 2023, although the airport actually closed down six days before this date, on November 24.

== Navigation ==
There were two non-precision instrument approaches available: a Global Positioning System (GNSS) approach to runway 33 and a localizer approach to runway 15.

== Radio ==
Buttonville Airport was in a Class E control zone. Pilots were required to broadcast their intentions on the mandatory frequency 124.8 MHz prior to entering the control zone. After the control tower closed in 2019, standard uncontrolled aerodrome position reports were required to be broadcast.

The London Flight Information Centre had a Remote Communications Outlet at the airport operating on the frequency 123.15 MHz. Toronto Terminal handled instrument flight rules (IFR) arrivals and departures and visual flight rules (VFR) flight following on 133.40 MHz.

Flightline is available on 123.50 MHz.

== Navigation aids ==
There were two ground-based navigation aids attached specifically to the Buttonville airport:

- a distance measuring equipment (DME) on channel 48 (111.1 MHz) with the identifier "IKZ", located on the airfield
- a localizer for runway 15 on the frequency 111.1 MHz

== Tenants ==
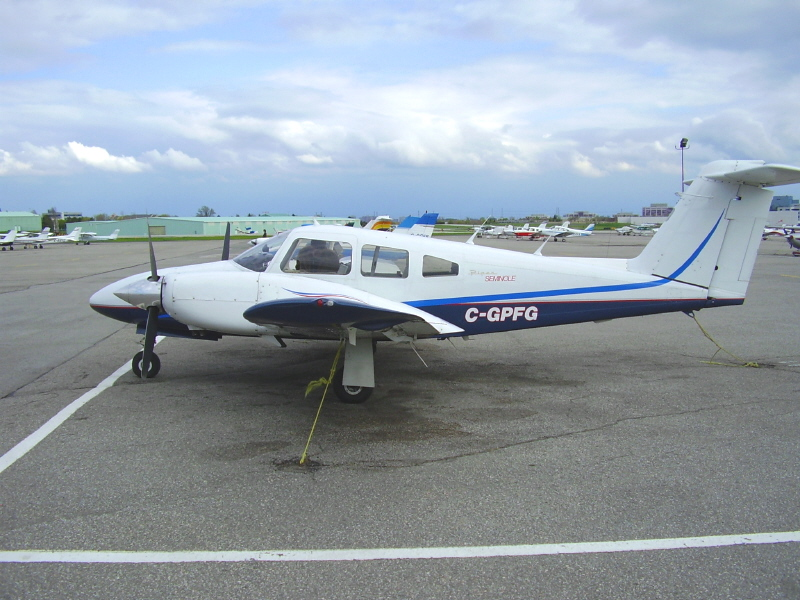
Multi-IFR trainer belonging to the flight school

Tenants at Buttonville Airport included the following. They either relocated to other airports near Toronto or ceased operations:

- 680 News Traffic Unit
- Air BP – aviation fuel supplier (100LL and A-1)
- Air Partners Incorporated – maintenance
- Aviation Unlimited – parts and aircraft sales distributor for Piper, Diamond, Mooney and Columbia
- Buttonville Flying Club
- CFMJ-AM, 640 AM Richmond Hill
- Canadian Flyers flight training school
- CFTO-CTV News/Traffic Air Unit (C-FCTV)
- CHFI-FM, 98.1 FM Toronto Traffic Unit (shared with 680 News)
- Corus Entertainment Toronto Traffic Unit
- Druxy's Famous Deli
- High Tech Avionics and Instruments – avionics and instrument supplies
- Image Air Charter Limited
- Leggat Aviation Ltd. – an authorized Cessna dealership that specializes in new aircraft sales, full service and parts supply
- Million Air – an executive air charter
- Seneca College's aviation campus (relocated to Peterborough Airport in 2014)
- Sugu Drone Training
- Toronto Police Service – Cessna 206H (C-FZRR)
- TruFinancial Consultants – tailor-made investment strategy, estate and financial planning services
- York Regional Police – operating base for the Air2 (C-GYRP), the force's helicopter

== Ground access ==
The airport was located next to Highway 404 at the 16 Avenue interchange with connections to nearby Highway 407, with Highway 401 further to the south.

== Incidents ==
On May 25, 2010, a Cirrus SR20 4-seater plane crashed on the roof of Thinkway Toys, which was just 500 m (1,600 ft) from the airport near Woodbine Avenue and Apple Creek Boulevard in Markham. The pilot and a passenger died in the crash; however, nobody on the ground was seriously hurt. Markham Fire & Emergency Services crews quickly doused the flames; rescue crews were not able to go on top of the building to reach the plane due to possibility of structural collapse.

On June 20, 2010, an accident occurred just outside the airport. A black four-seater banner-towing Cessna 172K Skyhawk, registration C-GQOR, crashed on Vogell Road near the Highway 404 and 16th Avenue interchange in Richmond Hill. The pilot, the aircraft's only occupant, was killed in the crash.

On July 12, 2018, a pilot was killed in a Bellanca 8KCAB when it crashed in a nearby field southwest of the airport.

On February 27, 2020, a US-registered Dassault Falcon 50 corporate jet (tail number N951DJ), was set on fire late at night. The fence surrounding the airport was cut through and a jerrycan was found at the scene. The aircraft, parked outside near a hangar, was written off, damaged beyond repair. The fire was considered arson.

On August 10, 2021, a Cessna on final approach struck a drone operated by York Regional Police, causing major damage to the aircraft, although there were no injuries.

== Support ==
The airport had one aircraft rescue and firefighting unit (ARFF), a Walter RIV 2000, but it was retired. Fire and rescue at the airfield was later provided by Markham Fire and Rescue Stations 9-2 (10 Riviera Drive near Woodbine Avenue and 14th Avenue) or 9-3 (Woodbine and Major Mackenzie Drive East).

== See also ==
- List of defunct airports in Canada
- List of airports in the Greater Toronto Area
