= Toronto Area Control Centre =

- IATA: ZYZ; ICAO: CZYZ

Summary
- Coordinates: 43°40′17.7486″N 079°37′38.499″W

Map
- Location within Ontario

Toronto Area Control Centre (ICAO: CZYZ) is one of seven area control centres in Canada operated by Nav Canada. The Toronto Area Control Centre is based near Toronto Pearson International Airport in Mississauga, Ontario.

From the Toronto Area Control Centre, air traffic controllers provide en route and terminal control services to aircraft in the Toronto Flight Information Region (FIR). The Toronto FIR airspace covers most of Southern Ontario, Central Ontario, parts of Eastern Ontario, and parts of northwestern Michigan. To the east are the air traffic control centres of Montreal and Boston; to the south are the Minneapolis, Cleveland (which covers the extreme southwestern area of Ontario), and New York air traffic control centres; to the west is the Winnipeg control centre.

== Aerodrome classes ==
The Toronto ACC assumes control of the following classes of airports:

Class C (Controlled, IFR/IFR, IFR/VFR and VFR/VFR separation, VFR: Mode C and ATC clearance required)

- CYYZ - Toronto Pearson International Airport in Mississauga, ON
- CYKF - Region of Waterloo International Airport in Breslau, ON
- CYXU - London International Airport in London, ON
- CYTZ - Billy Bishop Toronto City Airport (Toronto island) in Toronto, ON

Class D (Controlled, IFR/IFR and IFR/VFR separation, VFR: 2-way communication required)

- CYHM - John C. Munro Hamilton International Airport in Hamilton, ON
- CYOO - Oshawa Airport in Oshawa, ON
- CYAM - Sault Ste. Marie Airport in Sault Ste. Marie, ON
- CYTR - Trenton Airport in Trenton, ON

Class E (Controlled, only IFR/IFR spacing)

- CYKZ - Buttonville Municipal Airport in Markham, ON
- CYXR - Earlton (Timiskaming Regional) Airport in Eartton, ON
- CYEL - Elliot Lake Airport in Elliot Lake, ON
- CYZE - Gore Bay-Manitoulin Airport in Gore Bay/Barrie Island, ON
- CYYU - Kapuskasing Airport in Kapuskasing, ON
- CYGK - Kingston/Norman Rogers Airport in Kingston, ON
- CYMO - Moosonee Airport in Moosonee, ON
- CYQA - Muskoka Airport in Muskoka, ON
- CYYB - North Bay/Jack Garland Airport in North Bay, ON
- CYPQ - Peterborough Airport in Peterborough, ON
- CYZR - Sarnia Chris Hadfield Airport in Sarnia, ON
- CYSN - St. Catharines/Niagara District Airport in Niagara-on-the-Lake, ON
- CYSB - Sudbury Airport in Sudbury, ON
- CYTS - Timmins Airport in Timmins, ON
- CYZD - Toronto/Downsview Airport in Toronto, ON
- CYXZ - Wawa Airport in Wawa, ON
- CYVV - Wiarton Airport in Wiarton, ON

This FIR contains several Class G aerodromes that are in uncontrolled airspace and clearances are required to enter or leave controlled airspace.

Airports under these classes include:

- CPZ9 - Billy Bishop Toronto City Water Aerodrome in Toronto
- CZBA - Burlington Air Park in Burlington, ON

== Peripheral station frequencies ==
Within each FIR, there are transmitter sites that allow the relay of distant communication from aircraft back to the ACC. These links are called a peripheral station (PAL). They re-transmit the voice and data communication over high speed data links between the ACC and the remote transmitter.

== Frequencies ==
=== Terminal Control Unit ===
- Arrivals 1 - 132.800
- Arrivals 2 - 124.475
- Arrivals 3 - 125.400
- ILS Monitor - 134.175
- North Departure - 127.575
- South Departure - 128.800

=== Airports Specialty ===
==== East / West Satellite Sectors ====
- East Satellite (PIA Toronto) - 133.400
- West Satellite (PIA Toronto) - 119.300
- West Satellite (Hamilton) - 119.700
- West Satellite (Kitchener) - 128.275
- West Satellite (London) - 135.300
- West Satellite (Sarnia) - 134.375

=== West Speciality ===
==== High Sectors ====
- Centralia Sector - 125.775
- Oakville Sector - 134.925
- Mitchell Sector - 124.375
- Lucan Sector - 135.825

==== Low Sectors ====
- Hamilton Sector - 132.475
- Grimsby Sector - 133.300
- Kitchener Sector - 135.625

=== East Speciality ===
==== High Sectors ====
- Barrie Sector - 134.575
- Killaloe Sector - 121.225
- Picton Sector - 124.675

==== Low Sectors ====
- Simcoe Sector - 127.000
- East Radar (Toronto) - 124.925
- East Radar (Peterborough) - 134.250

=== North Speciality ===
==== High Sectors ====
- Sault Sector (Wawa) - 124.075
- Sault Sector (Bellevue) - 134.425
- Wiarton Sector (Midland) - 124.025
- North Bay Sector - 127.250
- North Bay Sector (Sudbury) - 135.500

==== Low Sectors ====
- Sault Low Sector (Sault Ste. Marie) - 132.650
- Sault Low Sector (Elliott Lake) - 135.400
- Wiarton Low - 132.575
- Kapuskasing (North Bay) - 132.700
- Timmins - 128.300
- Timmins (Moosonee) - 133.725

== See also ==
- Canadian airspace
