= AFSS =

AFSS can refer to:

- Autonomous Flight Safety System, used on rockets for range safety
- Automated Flight service station, air traffic facility e.g. in the US
