= Philadelphia TRACON =

Air traffic control facility in Pennsylvania, US

Coordinates: 39.8740°N 75.2435°W

Philadelphia TRACON is a combined Terminal Radar Approach Control (TRACON) and Air Traffic Control Tower (ATCT) facility located at Philadelphia International Airport (PHL). The facility provides both radar approach/departure services and tower operations, known as "Up-and-Down" capabilities. It is organized into three primary operational sectors: "A-side" controllers manage the tower and part of the radar room. "B-side" radar controllers control the traffic in and out of Philadelphia International Airport, and all if its nearby satellite airports and airspace. "C-side" radar controllers control the traffic in and out of Newark Liberty International Airport, and all of its nearby satellite airports and airspace.

Philadelphia International Airport is classified as a Level 12 facility. The TRACON manages approximately 2,800 aircraft movements daily, while the ATCT handles about 1,700 operations each day.

The primary responsibility of the Philadelphia TRACON/ATCT is to ensure the safe, orderly, and efficient flow of air traffic in the region. In addition to Philadelphia International Airport, the TRACON provides approach and departure services to several satellite airports, including:

- Northeast Philadelphia Airport (PNE) in Philadelphia, Pennsylvania
- Wilmington Airport (ILG) in Wilmington, Delaware
- Trenton–Mercer Airport (TTN) in Trenton, New Jersey
- Wings Field (LOM) in Blue Bell, Pennsylvania
- Heritage Field (PTW) in Pottstown, Pennsylvania
- Brandywine Regional Airport (OQN) in West Chester, Pennsylvania

The TRACON's airspace covers portions of Pennsylvania, New Jersey, Delaware, and northeastern Maryland.

In July 2024, the Newark sector of the New York TRACON was transferred to the Philadelphia TRACON. Newark operations are managed as a distinct area within the facility.

== TRACON breakdown ==
=== Philadelphia Area ===
- Final Vectors One – 125.400
- Final Vectors Two – 132.675
- North Arrival – 128.400
- South Arrival – 133.875
- North Departure – 124.350
- South Departure – 119.750
- North High – 126.075
- South High – 125.125
- Yardley – 123.800
- Pottstown – 126.850
- Dupont – 118.350
- Woodstown – 127.350

=== Newark Area ===
- Final Vector – 125.500
- North Arrival – 120.150
- North Arrival (Backup) – 135.575
- Yardley (South/Primary) – 128.550
- Yardley (South/Alternate) – 125.625
- Yardley (East) – 132.700
- METRO (Satellite) – 132.800
- MUGZY (Satellite) – 127.600
- ZEEBO (Satellite) – 123.775
- Departure (Primary) – 119.200
- Departure (Backup) – 128.800

== ATCT breakdown ==
- Local East – 118.500
- Local West – 135.100
- Ground East – 121.900
- Ground West – 121.650
- Clearance Delivery – 118.850
- Tower Sequencer (During SWAP)- 123.600

== Neighboring facilities ==
PHL is bordered by the following facilities:

- New York TRACON (N90)
- Potomac TRACON (PCT)
- Reading TRACON (RDG)
- McGuire RAPCON (WRI)
- Allentown TRACON (ABE)
- Dover RAPCON (DOV)
- Harrisburg TRACON (MDT)
- Atlantic City TRACON (ACY)

PHL airspace lies beneath both of the following ARTCCs:

- New York ARTCC (ZNY)
- Washington ARTCC (ZDC)
