= Boston Air Route Traffic Control Center =

Air traffic control center in Nashua, New Hampshire, US

Coordinates: 42.73517°N 71.48056°W

Boston Air Route Traffic Control Center (ZBW; radio communications: "Boston Center") is one of 22 Air Route Traffic Control Centers in the United States, located in Nashua, New Hampshire.

The primary responsibility of ZBW is the separation of overflights, and the expedited sequencing of arrivals and departures along STARs (standard terminal arrival routes) and SIDs (standard instrument departures) for the Boston Metropolitan Area, the New York Metropolitan Area, and other areas in the Northeastern United States.

Boston Center is the 18th-busiest air traffic control center in the United States. In 2024, Boston Center was responsible for handling 1,502,689 flights. As of 2026, the Boston Air Route Traffic Control Center (ARTCC) covers 165,000 square miles (430,000 km^{2}) of airspace, which includes airports in the New England region (Connecticut, Maine, Massachusetts, New Hampshire, Rhode Island, and Vermont), as well as eastern New York state and a portion in New Brunswick, Canada.

== Sectors ==
ZBW has a total of 30 sectors, including 16 Low Altitude sectors, 10 High Altitude sectors, and 1 Super High Altitude sector. There are also three Low-High Altitude sectors which usually cover from the surface to unlimited and do not fit into any of the other sector categories. Within the center, there are five areas, which other ARTCCs often refer to as "Specialties".

== Areas ==
In ZBW, the areas are labeled A through E.

Area A covers the majority of northeastern New York state. Area A handles a large quantity of traffic that has departed Logan International Airport in Boston or other nearby airports, as well as descending arrivals destined to New York metropolitan airports and other airports in ZBW airspace.

Area B covers most of Vermont and New Hampshire. Area B is primarily responsible for descending Boston Logan and Manchester–Boston Regional Airport arrivals, as well as climbing departures from these airports. Area B also descends and climbs traffic to and from airports such as Montréal–Trudeau International Airport, Albany International, Burlington International, Bradley International, John F. Kennedy International Airport and Newark Liberty International Airport.

Area C covers portions of Connecticut, Massachusetts and Rhode Island. Area C also covers about 60 miles (97 km) of over-ocean airspace south of Long Island. Area C is responsible for descending Boston Logan arrivals, climbing Boston Logan departures, and working arrival and departure traffic to and from John F. Kennedy International Airport. Area C also climbs all northeast-bound and oceanic departures from the New York metropolitan area. Additionally, Area C descends and climbs traffic to and from airports such as T. F. Green, Long Island MacArthur and Bradley International.

Area D is the largest area in ZBW, covering almost half of the total airspace. Area D overlies the eastern portions of Massachusetts and New Hampshire, and most of Maine, as well as owning airspace extending around 150 miles (240 km) east of the coast. Area D is responsible for descending and climbing traffic to and from Boston Logan, Bangor International Airport, Portland International Jetport and all Cape Cod area airports. Area D also includes some Canadian airspace, mostly over New Brunswick, but also a small area of Quebec. The bulk of this is an artifact dating back to the Cold War when Loring Air Force Base, a SAC bomber base lying very close to the international border, was active. Loring's circular terminal control area, that no longer exists, extended into New Brunswick. This area was included with the rest of the TCA in Boston's area of responsibility. The base closed in 1994, but the Canadian airspace has not been transferred back to Canadian control.

Area E covers portions of New York state and western Massachusetts. Area E is primarily responsible for working traffic landing and departing New York metropolitan airports such as John F. Kennedy, Newark Liberty and LaGuardia. The New York TRACON underlies most of Area E.

ZBW is bordered by the following ARTCCs/ACCs/FIRs:

- New York Air Route Traffic Control Center (ZNY)
- Cleveland Air Route Traffic Control Center (ZOB)
- Washington Air Route Traffic Control Center (ZDC)
- Montreal ACC (ZUL)
- Moncton ACC (ZQM)
- Toronto ACC (ZYZ)

== Sectors and frequencies ==
Boston ARTCC Operating Sector Boundaries and Frequencies

=== Area A ===
==== Low Altitude Sectors ====
- ALB 22 (Albany 22) - 121.350/257.850 Departure traffic flows consist of all jets off Albany requesting flight levels and prop departures going north, east or west. Bradley jet departures routed over CTR also traverse this sector. En route traffic flows include eastbound traffic on V2, westbound traffic on V490, northbound on V487, and southbound over ALB. Arrivals to EWR, PVD, ISP, HPN, BDL, LGA, MHT, SYR and ALB are descended through the Albany Sector. The Albany Sector controls from 110 up to FL230. It overlies about half of Albany ATCT and shares a common boundary with fourteen ZBW sectors. This sector is a departure, en route and arrival sector.
- HNK 23 (Hancock 23) - 133.250/279.500 This sector controls both arrivals and departures from SYR, UCA and BGM. It is also responsible for IFR approaches and departures to and from OIC, N66 and N23. The major traffic flows include arrivals to ALB, V167 traffic to EWR, V433 traffic to New York area airports, V14 traffic eastbound and V2 traffic westbound. The Hancock Sector controls from the ground up to 17,000 feet MSL. It shares a common boundary with Syracuse ATCT, Binghamton ATCT, Albany ATCT, Wilkes-Barre ATCT, New York TRACON (LIB Sector), two ZNY sectors, one ZOB sector and five ZBW sectors.

==== Low-High Altitude Sectors ====
- ART 08 (Watertown 08) - 135.250/377.100 This sector shares a common boundary with five different Canadian facilities. The Watertown Sector contains IRs, VRs, ARs, MOAs, ATCAAs and a Restricted Area. The Watertown Sector controls from the ground up except for the airspace that underlies the Utica Sector, which owns FL 280 and above, and the airspace delegated to Syracuse ATCT, Utica ATCT, Wheeler Sack ATCT, and Montreal Centre. The sector is responsible for IFR approaches and departures at MAL, MSS, YCC, OGS, and PTD. The sector also contains a number of small airports without SIAPs.

==== High Altitude Sectors ====
- UCA 09 (Utica 09) - 123.875/323.000 The Utica Sector controls FL 280 to FL 600. It shares a common boundary with three ZOB sectors and 9 ZBW sectors. The sector's primary traffic flow is westbound on J547. This traffic includes aircraft landing at ORD, DTW, CLE and MSP. Another traffic flow comes through the sector from the Canadian facilities. This includes traffic to and from YUL, YOW, YMX and JFK. Most traffic crosses at SYR. Two ARs and 5 ATCAAs are also found in this sector.
- DNY 24 (Delancey 24) - 127.375/353.925 The Delancey Sector is responsible for sequencing and descending aircraft destined to ALB, PHL, EWR, HPN, LGA and BDL. Most conflicts occur in the area from HNK to DNY to RKA and back to HNK. This is where most of the aircraft in this sector will be crossing and descending. The Delancey Sector controls from FL180 up to FL270. It shares a common boundary with two ZOB sectors, three ZNY sectors, and seven ZBW sectors.

==== Super High Altitude Sectors ====
- RKA 10 (Rockdale 10) - 124.125/273.550 The primary traffic flow through the sector is eastbound. The sector's primary purpose is to sequence traffic to BOS, BDL, PVD and PIT. At HNK, PIT and PVD arrivals cross with JFK departures that are still climbing to altitude. Just east of RKA, PIT arrivals cross with BDL arrivals. South of SYR, aircraft flightplanned toward JHW conflict with IAD and YUL arrivals, and all of these traffic flows conflict with eastbound traffic from ZOB. The Rockdale Sector controls FL280 and above. It shares a common boundary with two ZOB sectors, one ZNY sector and four ZBW sectors.

=== Area B ===
==== Low Altitude Sectors ====
- GDM 36 (Gardner 36) - 123.750/338.200 GDM Sector controls aircraft in an area encompassing Gardner, Massachusetts; Keene, New Hampshire; Mount Monadnock, New Hampshire; Turners Falls Airport (Montague, Massachusetts); Deerfield Valley Regional Airport (West Dover, Vermont) flight level 230 and below. En route NAVAIDs EEN VORTAC, GDM VORTAC.BOS, BOS satellite airport and MHT arrivals make up most of the turbojet traffic transitioning through the sector. GDM Sector also provides service to tower en route traffic entering and departing the New York metropolitan area at and below 10,000 feet. Radar coverage in the GDM Sector is very good due to its close proximity to ARSR and ASR-9 radars. Traffic advisories are also provided to VFR aircraft as workload permits. When traffic permits Sector 37 (Concord, New Hampshire) is combined with Sector 36 (Gardner).
- CON 37 (Concord 37) - 134.700/269.475 CON sector controls aircraft in an area covering the southern portion of New Hampshire, flight level 230 and below except for areas controlled by Boston Consolidated TRACON. En route NAVAIDs LEB, MHT VORDMEs and CON VORTAC. BOS, BOS satellite departures to the north and west fly through the CON sector. CON also provides approach control services to LEB airport. This sector is responsible for controlling LASER S and AR631. When traffic permits this sector is combined with Sector 36 (Gardner).
- MPV 52 (Montpelier 52) - 135.700/282.200 (or 120.350/342.250 at or below 10,000 in the SLK area) This sector is stratified from the surface to FL230. Traffic at FL180 and above is primarily en route via J595 or ALB-YSC, creating a crossing point 50 miles east of PLB. Low altitude traffic is not generally on any preferential route; there is no well-defined crossing point in the low structure. There is a high volume of traffic on V141 between BTV and LEB. Sector 52 is the controlling sector for YANKEE 1 and YANKEE 2 MOAs. Sector 52 controls all airspace within its lateral boundaries at all altitudes except for 5,000 feet and below delegated to CON-37 for the ILS-18 to LEB; 10,000 and below delegated to Burlington; and 5,000 feet and below delegated to Portland ATCT. When traffic permits Sector 53 is combined with Sector 52.

==== High Altitude Sectors ====
- ATHENS 38 (Athens 38) - 135.325/360.600 There are two eastbound flows of traffic in Sector 38. One is along J16, consisting of high altitude Boston terminal arrival traffic. The other is along J68 for PVD and Long Island metro arrivals. Crossing with these flows is north–south traffic to/from NY metro, destined for Canada and overseas. Sector 38 owns all airspace within its lateral boundaries at and above FL240. When traffic permits Sector 39 is combined with Sector 38.
- CAM 39 (Cambridge 39) - 128.325/348.700 Sector 39 is the high altitude, west departure sector for Boston metro. Traffic is primarily westbound, handed off from Sector 37, and climbing to en route flight levels. New York departure traffic crosses the Boston departure track about 30 NM west of MHT. Sector 39 is also responsible for sequencing high altitude NY arrival traffic flight planned over ALB. Sector 39 owns all airspace within its lateral boundaries at and above FL240. When traffic permits sector 39 is combined with sector 38.
- PLB 53 (Plattsburgh 53) - 118.825/251.075 This sector is stratified at FL240 and above. High altitude traffic is primarily north–south traffic going in or out of BTV, YUL, and YOW. Any crossing traffic is likely to occur at PLB. Low altitude traffic is also north–south into the same terminals. Sector 53 owns all airspace within its lateral boundaries. When traffic permits Sector 53 is combined with Sector 52. The sector contains a portion of the LASER ATCAAs and abuts the AKS and SCOTTY ATCAAs.

=== Area C ===
==== Low Altitude Sectors ====
- CLIPPER 32 (CLIPPER 32) - 135.800/292.150 This is the new sector created with the combination of the SARDI and ERICK sectors. This sector serves as a departure and arrival sector for North Atlantic JFK departures, departure and arrival sector for Long Island and southern Connecticut airports, arrival sector for White Plains Airport, and an en route sector for north–south low altitude overflights. The departures are handed off by N90 (JFK and ISP areas), and the arrivals are handed off to New York TRACON (ISP area) or New York TRACON Rober arrivals. JFK arrivals overhead CCC are potentially in conflict with VFR parachute operations at Skydive Long Island which operate over the CCC VOR. The SARDI sector, which became CLIPPER, was working TWA800 when it exploded.
- PVD 34 (Providence 34) - 124.850/269.200 (Handles BOS arrivals from the southwest) The sector serves as a primary arrival sector for jets landing at Logan Airport that are handed off to Boston ATCT. Additional traffic flows include Bradley departures traveling southeast and non-jet arrivals landing at Boston south satellite airports. The sector serves as a meter sector for Logan Airport.
- BOSOX 47 (BOSOX 47) - 133.425/307.900 (Handles BOS departures to the west-southwest & BED/PVD arrivals/depts to/from west) The sector serves as a primary departure sector for departures handed off by Boston ATCT and by Providence ATCT traveling west/southwest. Additional traffic includes Bradley departures via HFD VOR handed off by Bradley TRACON and Boston north satellite arrivals handed off to Bradley TRACON.

==== High Altitude Sectors ====
- HTO 31 (Hampton 31) - 124.525/254.375 The primary traffic flow in the sector is north–south overflights. Additional flows are North Atlantic JFK departures and Providence arrivals from the southwest. The primary area for traffic conflicts is southwest of HTO between the JFK departures, PHL arrivals, and other overflight traffic.
- BOS 46 (Boston 46) - 126.225/370.900 The primary traffic flows in the sector are Logan and Providence departures to the west/southwest, JFK arrivals via TRAIT Intersection, New York metro departures bound for Europe, and overflights. BOSTON is the busiest, most complex sector in Area C. The western boundary of the sector approximately traverses the Naugatuck Valley of Connecticut, with IGN 20 high altitude sector being to the west.

==== Super High Altitude Sector ====
- SOUTHIE 49 (Southie 49) - 132.300/346.300 This sector overlies the HTO sector and is split from it during busy traffic periods. At those times the HTO sector will only work aircraft up to 31,000 feet (FL310) and Southie will work aircraft FL320 and above and FL280 and above over the New York Metro Area. When New York Center shuts off traffic from Boston and or Washington Center, aircraft are routed through HTO and SOUTHIE to keep things moving. This is an example of the flexibility of Boston and Washington, without which delays would climb significantly.

=== Area D ===
==== Low Altitude Sectors ====
- SURRY 15 (SURRY 15) - 120.250/346.400, 124.250/290.500, 124.750/239.050 Sector 15 is a low altitude sector that serves a number of Maine airports: BGR, BXM, AUG, HUL, PQI and PNN. It also contains a limited amount of military traffic utilizing IR routes, air refueling tracks and SUA. There is a wide variety of traffic flows within the sector. The sector abuts Moncton Centre, Montreal Centre, Portland ATCT, Bangor ATCT and ZBW sectors.
- PARSO 16 (PARSO 16) - 128.200/263.050 Sector 16 is a low altitude sector that contains departure and arrival traffic into airports such as PWM, BXM, PSM, LEW, AUG, RKD and BOS. There is also a significant amount of overflight traffic proceeding between BOS and ME. The sector coordinates with Portland ATCT, BCT, Cape TRACON, and ZBW sectors. Parso Sector assumes Portland ATCT airspace during mid-shift closure of the facility.

==== Low-High Altitude Sectors ====
- ACK 17 (Nantucket 17) - 133.450/269.300 Sector 17 is stratified from the surface to FL999. Traffic flow within the sector is mainly east–west and consists mostly of high altitude aircraft proceeding to and from overseas destinations. The sector coordinates with Moncton Centre, New York ARTCC, Cape TRACON, VACAPES (Giant Killer) and ZBW sectors.
- CAPE 18 (Cape 18) - 128.750/290.300 Sector 18 is stratified from the surface to FL999. The sector traffic consists of departure and arrival traffic to airports such as FMH, HYA, ACK, MVY and PVD. There is also a significant number of BOS departures and some overflight traffic. The sector coordinates with BCT, Boston Tower, Cape TRACON, Providence ATCT, VACAPES (Giant Killer) and ZBW sectors.

==== High Altitude Sectors ====
- MLT 01 (Millinocket 01) - 128.050/319.100 Sector 01 is a high altitude sector that contains four major traffic flows that run north, south, east, and west. The traffic proceeding north and south consists mainly of aircraft proceeding to and from overseas destinations. The east and west traffic flows transit between Moncton and Montreal Centres and overseas airports. Coordination is conducted with Moncton Centre, Montreal Centre and ZBW sectors. This sector is generally combined with sector 02 unless frequency congestion necessitates the split of the two sectors. It is also sometimes combined with the underlying Surry sector in a configuration called "Surrinocket".
- AUG 02 (Augusta 02) - 134.950/307.000 Sector 02 is a high altitude sector consisting mainly of overseas traffic proceeding north–south or east–west. The sector also serves a number of aircraft, climbing/descending high altitude, which are departing and arriving Maine and New Hampshire airports. The sector coordinates with Moncton Centre, Montreal Centre and ZBW sectors.

=== Area E ===
==== Low Altitude Sectors ====
- SWF 05 (Stewart 05) - 134.300/256.900 Sector 05 primarily works New York metropolitan arrivals. The sector provides en route spacing to EWR and EWR satellite airports in a southerly flow. Sector 05 also sequences aircraft landing LGA and HPN airports, and their respective satellites that are entering Sector 06. In addition, Sector 05 works arrivals and departures to/from the Catskill-area airports, as well as en route traffic on V408, V106, and V58.
- PWL 06 (Pawling 06) - 128.100/353.675 Sector 06 primarily works LGA, HPN, JFK, and ISP area arrivals. The primary flow of traffic is to the south, in a descending configuration. The sector also works Bradley departures that climb southwest bound into Sector 20, ALB arrivals proceeding to the north and other en route traffic on V58, V487, and V292.
- CTR 07 (Chester 07) - 127.650/257.925 Sector 07 works arrival traffic to the Bradley terminal area via the Albany VORTAC, the SWEDESTAR, and all departure traffic via Pawling and Chester VORs. In addition, Sector 07 works arrival and departure traffic to and from Albany, en route traffic to EWR, LGA, HPN, MHT, BOS, Boston satellites, and all en route traffic on V39/V93. Metering requirements for BOS are accomplished at the WHATE Intersection.
- DXR 19 (Danbury 19) - 134.000/317.700 Sector 19 works New York metropolitan departures to the north/northeast via GREKI, MERIT and BAYYS Intersections. Sector 19 sequences BOS arrival traffic from overhead the JFK VOR with turbojet departures via MERIT from the New York metropolitan area. In addition, Sector 19 works arrivals to BDL, ORH, BED, MHT, and SWF via DPK, and ALB arrivals via LGA.
- CANAN 21 (CANAN 21) - 132.650/379.100 Sector 21 sequences southbound arrival traffic to the New York metropolitan airports that will enter Sector 05 and 06. In addition, Sector 21 works arrival and departures to the Albany and Bradley terminal areas and en route traffic on V270 and V292.

==== High Altitude Sectors ====
- IGN 20 (Kingston 20) - 125.575/290.350 Sector 20 is the only high altitude sector in Area E. The sector sequences BDL, ORH, ALB, and Catskill area departures with en route traffic on J80, J77, J6, J75, and J37. Sector 20 also works aircraft landing LGA and JFK from the north and northwest as well as aircraft departing the New York metropolitan area proceeding over CAM or MARTN.

== Traffic Management Unit (TMU) ==
It is the job of the TMU to balance air traffic demand with system capacity to ensure maximum efficiency and utilization of the airspace. As a result, this creates a safe and orderly flow of traffic while minimizing delays. The TMU reports to the ATCSCC (Air Traffic Control System command center).

Some of the methods that can be used to help minimize delays are the following:

- Altitude
- Minutes-in-trail/Miles-in-trail
- Fix balancing
- Airborne Holding
- Sequencing programs which include Departure sequencing program (DSP), Arrival Sequencing Program (ASP)or En-route sequencing program (ESP).
- Ground delay programs
- Ground stops

== Center Weather Service Unit ==
The Center Weather Service Unit (CWSU) is a Joint Aviation Weather Support Team composed of on-site National Weather Service (NWS) meteorologists and a Supervisory Traffic Management Coordinator (STMC) or Traffic Management Coordinator (TMC) assigned to the Weather Coordinator (WC) position. The purpose of the CWSU is to provide weather consultation and advice to managers and staff within ZBW and to other Federal Aviation Administration (FAA) facilities.

== Flight Data Communications Unit ==
The purpose of this unit is to provide data processing and monitor all flight plan related entries into the En Route Automatiom Modernization (ERAM) computer system. These flight data messages are exchanged with other air traffic facilities and occasionally require format and content corrections.
