= Montreal Center =

Montreal Center or Montréal Centre may refer to:

- Montreal Centre (federal riding)
- Montreal Centre (provincial electoral district)
- Downtown Montreal
- Montreal Area Control Centre
