= Montreal Area Control Centre =

Coordinates: 45.4779°N 73.7717°W

Montreal Area Control Centre (ICAO: CZUL) is one of 7 Area Control Centres in Canada operated by Nav Canada. Montreal ACC is located in a building on the outskirts of Montréal–Pierre Elliott Trudeau International Airport.

From this ACC, air traffic controllers provide en route and terminal control services to aircraft in the Montreal Flight Information Region (FIR). The Montreal FIR airspace covers the entire province of Quebec (with the exception of the Bagotville Military Terminal Control Area), parts of eastern Ontario, the eastern shore of James Bay, Hudson Bay, the western section of Newfoundland and Labrador and the Nunavut region that includes Iqaluit. The Montreal FIR is bordered by 6 Flight Information Regions. To the east are the Moncton and Gander FIRs, to the south is the Boston ARTCC, to the west are the Toronto and Winnipeg FIRs and the Edmonton FIR to the north.

== Aerodrome classes ==
The Montreal ACC assumes control of the following classes of airports:

Class C (Controlled, IFR/IFR, IFR/VFR and VFR/VFR separation, VFR: Mode C and ATC clearance required)

- CYUL – Montréal–Pierre Elliott Trudeau International Airport in Montreal, QC
- CYMX – Montréal-Mirabel International Airport in Mirabel, QC
- CYHU – Montreal Metropolitan Airport in Saint-Hubert, QC
- CYOW – Ottawa Macdonald–Cartier International Airport in Ottawa, ON
- CYQB – Québec City Jean Lesage International Airport in Sainte-Foy, QC
- CYRC - Chicoutimi/Saint-Honoré Aerodrome in Saint-Honoré, QC

Class D (Controlled, IFR/IFR and IFR/VFR separation, VFR: 2-way communication required)

- CYJN – Saint-Jean Airport in Saint-Jean-sur-Richelieu, QC

Class E (Controlled, only IFR/IFR spacing)

- CYBC – Baie-Comeau Airport in Baie-Comeau, QC
- CYFB – Iqaluit Airport in Iqaluit, NU
- CYGP – Michel-Pouliot Gaspé Airport in Gaspe, QC
- CYND – Gatineau-Ottawa Executive Airport in Gatineau, QC
- CYGL – La Grande Rivière Airport near Radisson, QC
- CYYY – Mont-Joli Airport in Mont-Joli, QC
- CYUY – Rouyn-Noranda Airport in Rouyn-Noranda, QC
- CYZV – Sept-Îles Airport in Sept-Iles, QC
- CYVO – Val-d'Or Airport in Val-d'Or, QC
- CYWK – Wabush Airport in Wabush, NL

This FIR contains several Class G aerodromes that are in uncontrolled airspace and IFR clearances are required to enter or leave controlled airspace.

== Peripheral station (PAL) frequencies ==
Within each FIR, there are transmitter sites that allow the relay of distant communication from aircraft back to the ACC. These links are called a peripheral station (PAL). They re-transmit the voice and data communication over high speed data links between the ACC and the remote transmitter. There are several PALs in the Montreal FIR:

- Brevoort 132.025 & 134.85 (FL290 & above)
- Brisay 119.4 & 126.5 (FL290 & above)
- Brockville-Thousand Islands Regional 134.675 & 231.95 (Below FL240)
- Campbellford 135.05 & 398.4 (Below FL240)
- Chibougamau 127.3 (Below FL290) 133.025 & 253.2 (FL290 & above)
- Chisasibi 132.325 (FL290 & above)
- Inukjuak 132.675 (FL290 & above)
- Iqaluit 132.8 (FL290 & above) 134.55 (Below FL290)
- Kapuskasing 133.975 (FL290 & above)
- Kuujjuaq 132.45 & 133.2 134.2 (FL290 & above) 135.1 (below FL290) 135.8 (FL290 & above)
- La Grande Rivière (LG-2) 132.1 (Below FL290) 133.775 (FL290 & above)
- La Tuque 134.5 (Below FL290)
- Lac Levesque 134.225 (FL290 & above)
- Mont-Joli 132.625 (FL290 & above) 134.65 & 227.2 (Below FL290)
- Mont-Laurier 126.575 (Below FL290) 127.875 (FL290 & above)
- Moosonee 118.975 (FL290 & above)
- Ottawa 124.275 134.975 266.8 (Below FL290) 127.7 128.175 135.15 & 247.0 & 252.5 (Below 14,000) 128.775 (Below FL240)
- Pembroke 135.2 & 278.5 (Below FL240)
- Puvirnituq 134.725 (FL290 & above)
- Québec 124.0 & 127.85 322.8 (Below 14,000) 135.025 & 270.9 (Below FL290)
- Rivière-du-Loup 125.1 & 29.6 (Below FL290)
- Rouyn 120.725 (FL290 & above)
- St-Adrien 123.925 & 133.225 (FL290 & above) 132.35 (Below FL290)
- Schefferville 132.9 (Below FL290)
- Sept-Iles 135.55 & 381.9 (Below FL290)
- Sherbrooke 132.55 & 226.0 (Below FL290)
- Timmins 133.975 & 381.4 (FL290 & above)
- Trois-Rivières 128.225 (Below FL290)
- Val-d'Or 125.9 & 308.3 (Below FL290)
- Wabush 132.25 (Below FL290)

Montreal Frequencies

- Below FL240 – 118.9, 124.65, 126.9, 132.85, 268.3
- Below FL290 – 125.15, 134.15, 135.6, 229.2, 245.0, 294.0
- FL290 & above – 134.4, 287.2, 350.7

== See also ==
- Canadian airspace
