= ZBW (disambiguation) =

ZBW is a code for Boston Air Route Traffic Control Center

ZBW may also refer to:

- German National Library of Economics (German Zentralbibliothek für Wirtschaftswissenschaften)
- zbw, the ISO939-3 code for Berawan language
- A Z code for "Change to backup frequency no."
