= GCO =

GCO may refer to:

- Gemini Air Cargo, a defunct American cargo airline
- Genesco, an American footwear retailer
- GeorgiaCarry.org, an American gun rights organization
- Gotham Chamber Opera, a defunct American opera company
- Graphics and Calligraphy Office, a unit of the Social Office at the White House
- Grande ceinture Ouest, a section of the Grande Ceinture de Paris
- Ground communication outlet, a system installed at some U.S. airports
