= Ground communication outlet =

Device to communicate with air traffic control

Ground communications outlets (GCO) have been installed at some U.S. airports to provide a means for pilots on the ground to communicate with flight service stations and air traffic control (ATC) facilities for the purpose of filing, opening and closing VFR or IFR flight plans; obtaining weather briefings and clearances; and similar communications. Larger facilities instead have a remote communications outlet (RCO) installed, which allows pilots to communicate directly over a remote radio transmitter/receiver with the facility. A GCO instead connects with the aircraft/pilot via a radio transmitter/receiver, but with the ground facility via a telephone connection.

Special electronic components in the GCO connect the radio communications from the aircraft to the telephone communications from the facility. Because GCO units are not part of the official air traffic control radio system, they may not receive regular operational status checks and therefore may experience unreported outages. However, since they do not provide guaranteed service, they also entail lower costs and can be installed at smaller locations that cannot afford an RCO. In areas with cellular telephone coverage, the use of a GCO has sometimes been replaced by simply calling the air traffic control facility directly.

The system uses the airport's listed frequency (121.725 or 135.075 ). The system is activated with four "key clicks" on the VHF radio to contact the appropriate ATC facility or six "key strokes" to contact the FSS. There is a timer on the modem connection. If no voice is heard for a preset interval, the system disconnects. The VHF transceiver is very low power, 2–5 watts, which sometimes limits access. The GCO system is intended to be used only on the ground. GCO availability is noted in the text portion of the airport diagram.

== See also ==
- Remote communications outlet
