= Winnipeg Area Control Centre =

Coordinates: 49.9004°N 97.2596°W

The Winnipeg Area Control Centre (ICAO: CZWG) is one of seven Area Control Centres (facilities responsible for controlling air traffic) in Canada, operated by Nav Canada.

Located at 777 Moray Street in Winnipeg, Manitoba, the centre controls all air traffic in Manitoba below 60,000 feet (including waters in Hudson Bay), as well as parts of Saskatchewan (from the Alberta border to Thompson) and Ontario west of Thunder Bay (including waters of Hudson Bay and James Bay). To the east, its area of responsibility borders the Toronto Area Control Centre, and to the west, it borders the Edmonton Area Control Centre.
