= Nav Canada =

Canadian civil air navigation system operator

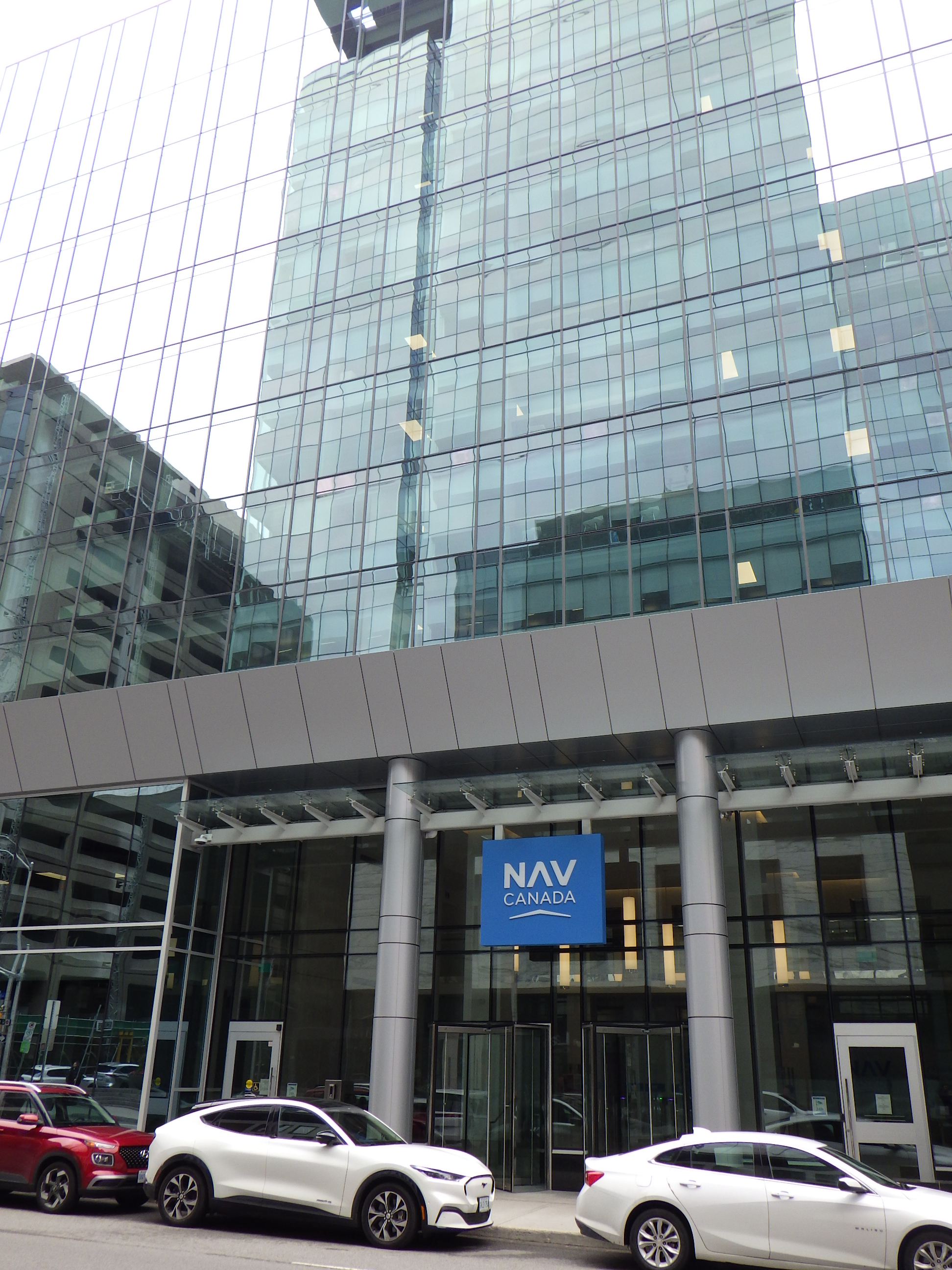
- Nav Canada Headquarters, 151 Slater Street, Ottawa, Ontario K1P 5H3
- Type: Non-share capital corporation/Statutory
- Industry: Civil aviation
- Founded: 1996
- Headquarters: 151 Slater Street; Ottawa, Ontario K1P 5H3; Canada
- Products: Civil air navigation
- Number of employees: 4,650
- Website: www.navcanada.ca

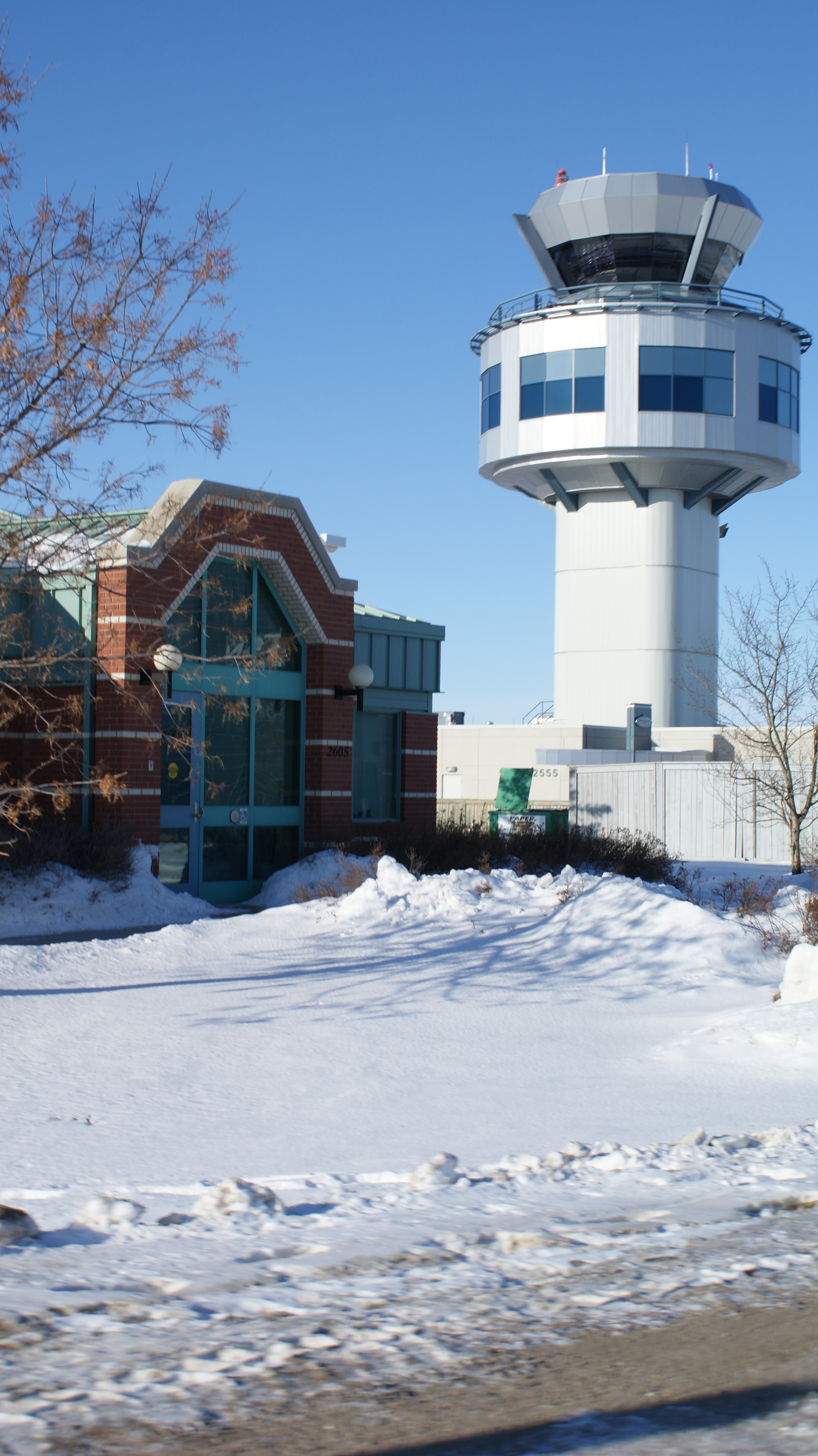
The Nav Canada control tower in Saskatoon

Nav Canada (styled as NAV CANADA) is a privately run, non-profit corporation that owns and operates Canada's civil air navigation system (ANS). It was established by statute in accordance with the Civil Air Navigation Services Commercialization Act (ANS Act).

The company employs approximately 1,900 air traffic controllers (ATCs), 650 flight service specialists (FSSs) and 700 technologists. It has been responsible for the safe, orderly and expeditious flow of air traffic in Canadian airspace since 1 November 1996 when the government transferred the ANS from Transport Canada to Nav Canada. As part of the transfer, or privatization, Nav Canada paid the government CA$1.5 billion.

Nav Canada manages 12 million aircraft movements a year for 40,000 customers in over 18 million square kilometres (6.9 million square miles), making it the world's second-largest air navigation service provider (ANSP) by traffic volume.

Nav Canada, which operates independently of any government funding, is headquartered in Ottawa, Ontario. It is only allowed to be funded by publicly traded debt and service charges to aircraft operators.

== Facilities ==
Nav Canada's operations consist of various sites across the country. These include:

- About 1,400 ground-based navigation aids
- 55 flight service stations
- 4 flight information centres, one each in:
  - Kamloops – British Columbia and Yukon
  - Edmonton – all of Saskatchewan, Manitoba, Alberta, northeastern BC, Northwest Territories, western Hudson Bay and Nunavut (west of Baffin Island)
  - London – all of Nova Scotia, Prince Edward Island, Newfoundland and Labrador, most of Ontario, and New Brunswick
  - Quebec City – all of Quebec, southwestern Labrador, tip of eastern Ontario, northern New Brunswick, eastern Hudson Bay, and Baffin Island, Nunavut
- 42 control towers
- 46 radar sites and 15 Automatic Dependent Surveillance–Broadcast (ADS-B) ground sites
- 7 area control centres, one each in:
  - Vancouver Area Control Centre (CZVR) – Surrey
  - Edmonton Area Control Centre (CZEG) – Edmonton International Airport
  - Winnipeg Area Control Centre (CZWG) – Winnipeg James Armstrong Richardson International Airport
  - Toronto Area Control Centre (CZYZ) – Toronto Pearson International Airport
  - Montreal Area Control Centre (CZUL) – Montréal–Trudeau International Airport
  - Moncton Area Control Centre (CZQM) – Riverview
  - Gander Area Control Centre (CZQX) – Gander International Airport
- North Atlantic Oceanic control centre: Gander Control

Nav Canada has two other facilities:

- National Operations Centre: Ottawa (77 Metcalfe Street)
- Technical Systems Centre: Ottawa (280 Hunt Club Road)

== Former facilities ==
In addition to its current network, Nav Canada has operated a number of facilities in the past that have since been closed, consolidated, or sold.

- Cornwall's DEV Hotel and Conference Centre (formerly the Nav Centre and the Nav Canada Training and Conference Centre – 1950 Montreal Road in Cornwall, Ontario) was rebranded and sold in 2022 to the Devcore Group
- Flight information centres
  - The Winnipeg Flight Information Centre, which was closed in 2022 following the consolidation of services into the Edmonton and London Flight Information Centres.
  - The Halifax Flight Information Centre, which was closed in 2020 following the consolidation of services into the London Flight Information Centre.

== Corporate governance ==
As a non-share capital corporation, Nav Canada has no shareholders. The company is governed by a 15-member board of directors representing the four stakeholder groups that founded Nav Canada. The four stakeholders elect 10 members as follows:

| Stakeholders | Seats |
|---|---|
| Air carriers | 4 |
| General and business aviation | 1 |
| Federal government | 3 |
| Bargaining agents (unions) | 2 |

These 10 directors then elect four independent directors, with no ties to the stakeholder groups. Those 14 directors then appoint the president and chief executive officer who becomes the 15th board member.

This structure ensures that the interests of individual stakeholders do not predominate and no member group could exert undue influence over the remainder of the board. To further ensure that the interests of Nav Canada are served, these board members cannot be active employees or members of airlines, unions, or government.

== History ==
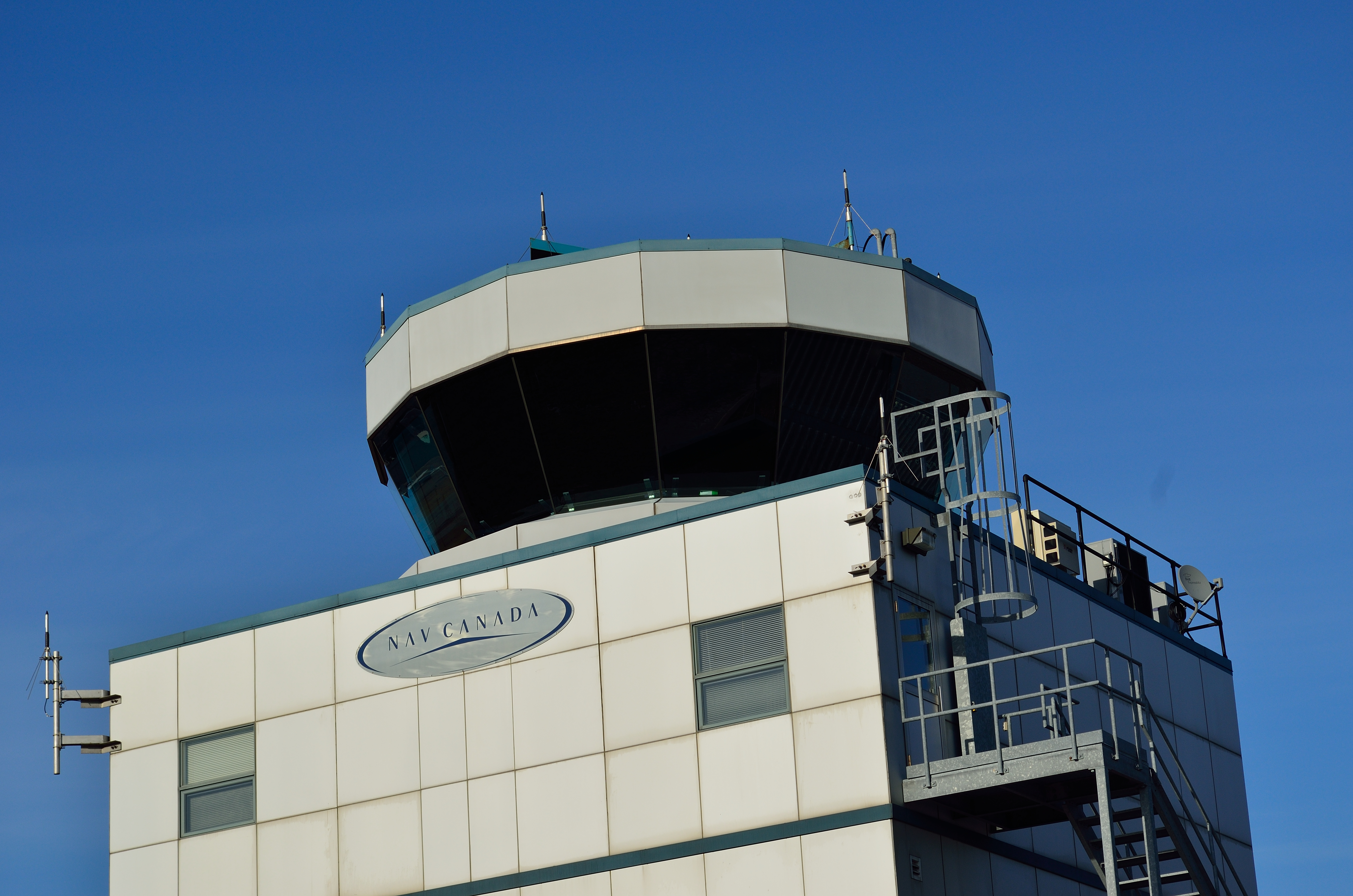
Nav Canada control tower at the now closed Buttonville Airport.

The company began operations on 1 November 1996, when the government sold and moved the country's air navigation services from Transport Canada to the new not-for-profit private entity for CAD$1.5 billion.

The company was formed in response to a number of issues with Transport Canada's (TC) operation of air traffic control and air navigation facilities. While TC's safety record and operational staff were rated highly, its infrastructure was old and in need of serious updating at a time of government restraint. This resulted in system delays for airlines and costs that were exceeding the airline ticket tax, a directed tax that was supposed to fund the system. The climate of government wage freezes resulted in staff shortages of air traffic controllers that were hard to address within a government department. Having TC as the service provider, the regulator and inspector was a conflict of interest. Pressure from the airlines on the government mounted for a solution to the problem that was hurting the air industry's bottom line.

A number of solutions were considered, including forming a crown corporation, but rejected in favour of outright privatization, the new company being formed as a non-share-capital not-for-profit, run by a board of directors who were initially appointed and now elected.

The company's revenue is predominantly from service fees charged to aircraft operators, which amount to about CAD$1.2B annually. Nav Canada also raises revenues from developing and selling technology and related services to other air navigation service providers around the world. It also has some smaller sources of income, such as conducting maintenance work for other ANS providers and rentals from the Nav Centre in Cornwall, Ontario.

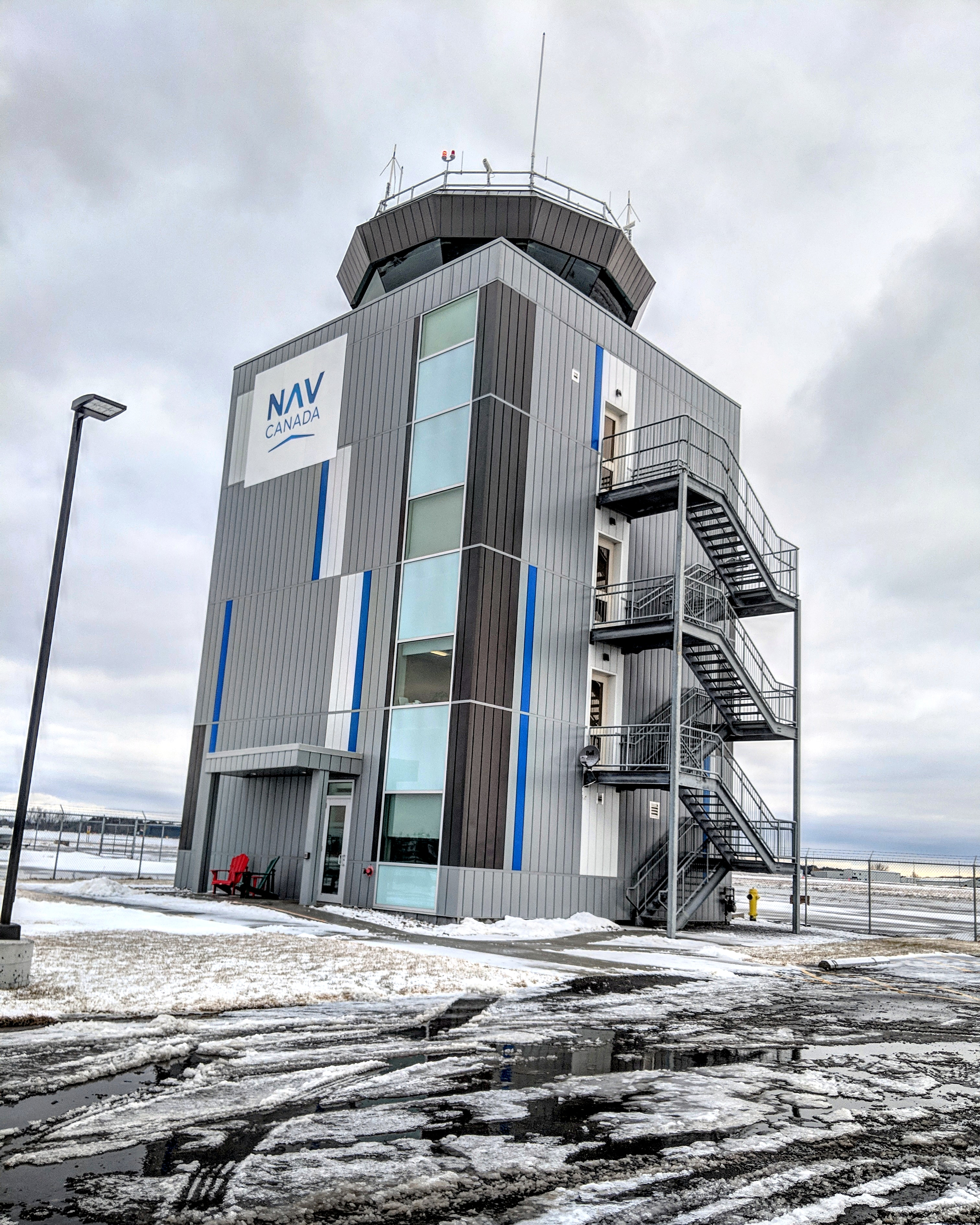
The newly designed Nav Canada control tower at Oshawa Executive Airport.

To address the old infrastructure it purchased from the Canadian government, the company has carried out projects such as implementing a wide area multilateration (WAM) system, replacing 95 instrument landing system (ILS) installations with new equipment, new control towers in Toronto, Edmonton and Calgary, modernizing the Vancouver Area Control Centre and building a new logistics centre

=== Late 2000s recession ===
Nav Canada felt the impact of the late-2000s recession in two ways: losses in its investments in third party sponsored asset-backed commercial paper (ABCP) and falling revenues due to reduced air traffic levels. In the summer of 2007, the company held $368 million in ABCP, which had become illiquid. On 12 January 2009, final Ontario Superior Court of Justice approval was granted to restructure the third party ABCP notes. The company expects that the non-credit related fair value variances from face value on restructured and non-restructured ABCP (amounting cumulatively to $33 at 30 November 2013) will be recovered by the time the notes mature in fiscal year 2017. By fiscal year end 2013, the company's revenues reached $1,231 million, which exceeded its pre-recession level and fiscal year 2014 saw further revenue growth to $1,272 million. During the period 2005-15, the company held service charge rates steady.

=== Hudson Bay ADS-B deployment ===
In the mid-2000s, the company decided to address the lack of radar coverage in the Canadian north, especially in the area of Hudson Bay where airliners transition from the North Atlantic Tracks system to Canadian Domestic Airspace by deploying a ground-based Automatic Dependent Surveillance–Broadcast (ADS-B) network. The five station network was operational on 15 January 2009, filling a 850,000 km^{2} (330,000 sq mi) gap in radar coverage which allowed reduced separation of airline flights by ADS-B tracking over procedural separation. In January 2009, Nav Canada estimated that the ADS-B system would save its customers 18 million litres (4,000,000 imperial gallons; 4,800,000 US gallons) and reduce CO_{2} and equivalent emissions by 50,000 t (110,000,000 lb) per year.

In November 2010, a second set of six ground-based ADS-B transceivers was later deployed along the coast of Labrador and Nunavut, providing an additional 1,980,000 km^{2} (760,000 sq mi). In March 2012 four more stations were added in Greenland, increasing the area covered by 1,320,000 km^{2} (510,000 sq mi).

=== Space-based ADS-B ===
In 2012, Nav Canada and the satellite communications company Iridium Communications launched Aireon as a joint venture to offer air traffic control authorities the ability to track aircraft around the globe in real time using satellite-based ADS-B technology.

Aireon uses Automatic Dependent Surveillance–Broadcast (ADS-B) receivers installed as an additional payload on 66 Iridium NEXT second-generation satellites launched between 2017 and 2019. Nav Canada invested $150 million for a 51% stake in Aireon.

The cross-linked Low Earth orbit (LEO) satellites made it possible, for the first time, to track aircraft from pole-to-pole, including oceanic airspace and remote regions, facilitating fuel savings, greenhouse gas emissions reduction, and enhanced safety and efficiency for airspace users. The new surveillance that Aireon provided would enable air traffic control to significantly reduce the separation standard in oceanic and other unsurveilled airspace from approximately 80 to 15 nautical miles (148 to 28 km; 92 to 17 mi) or less, allowing more aircraft to fly at optimum altitudes and to benefit from the prevailing winds such as the jet stream, further saving fuel and reducing greenhouse gas emissions.

Aireon CEO Don Thoma estimated in 2014 that once active, the service would result in an average fuel savings of $400 per flight for the three-and-a-half-hour trip across the North Atlantic. The annual fuel cost savings for airlines in the North Atlantic alone would be on the order of $125 million.

In December 2013, ANSPs from three additional countries joined Nav Canada as partners in Aireon. ENAV of Italy, the Irish Aviation Authority and Denmark's Naviair signed on for a combined investment of $120 million resulting in a new ownership structure for the company with Nav Canada holding 51 per cent, Iridium with 24.5 per cent, ENAV at 12.5 per cent and the Irish Aviation Authority and Naviair each holding 6%.

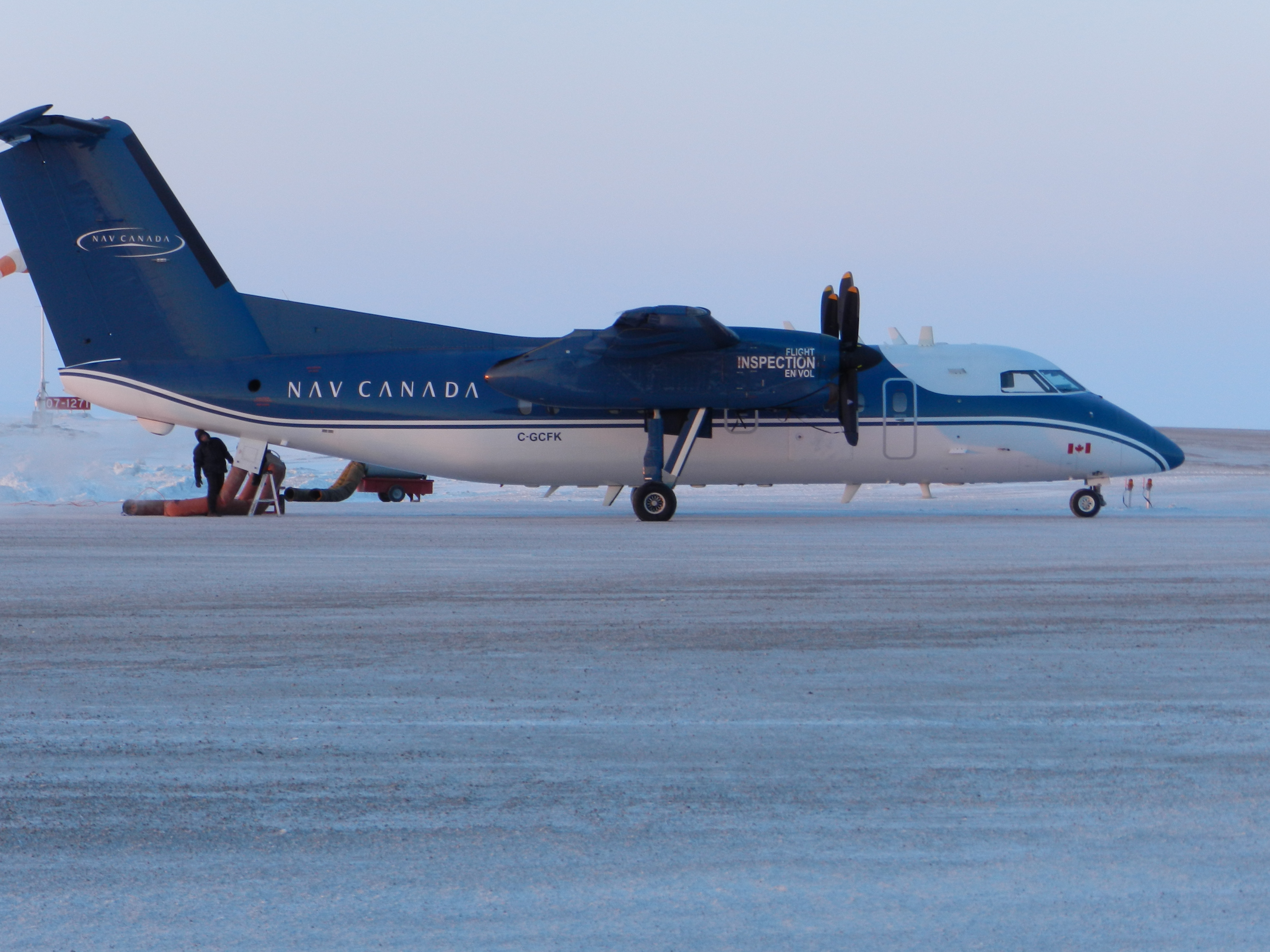
A De Havilland Canada Dash 8 (DHC-8-102) formerly used for flight inspection at Cambridge Bay Airport in 2014

In September 2014, Aireon announced plans to offer ALERT (Aircraft Locating and Emergency Response Tracking), a free supplementary service for emergency tracking of aircraft in trouble. Aireon's ADS-B receivers on Iridium's satellites will already include ALERT's capabilities and the company has decided to make it available free of charge "as a public service." Aireon ALERT could be activated by any certified air-safety organization to request the last known location and flight path of any aircraft carrying an ADS-B transponder, even if the operator does not subscribe to Aireon.

In May 2026, NavCan agreed to sell its stake in Aireon to Iridium as part of a deal in which Aireon became a wholly-owned subsidiary of Iridium.

== Fleet ==
Nav Canada operates a small fleet of aircraft. These aircraft are mainly used for flight inspection of navigation equipment and procedures. As of 11 November 2025, Nav Canada had two Bombardier CRJ 200 registered with Transport Canada and operate as ICAO airline designator NVC, and telephony NAV CAN.

Nav Canada previously operated, for the same purposes, two Bombardier Challenger 601-1A and a Bombardier Dash-8 Series 100 inherited from Transport Canada until April 2019.
