= New York Air Route Traffic Control Center =

Air traffic control center in New York, U.S.

Coordinates: 40°47′2″N 73°5′49″W

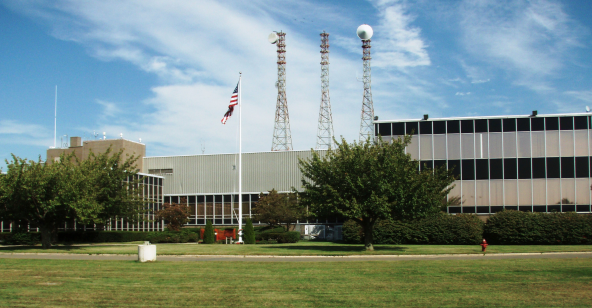
The front of New York Air Route Traffic Control Center

New York Air Route Traffic Control Center (ZNY) (radio communications: "New York Center") is one of 22 Air Route Traffic Control Centers (ARTCCs) operated by the United States Federal Aviation Administration. It is located on the grounds of Long Island MacArthur Airport in Ronkonkoma, New York. It was the world's first en-route air traffic control facility.

The primary responsibility of New York Center is the separation and sequencing of over-flights, arrivals, and departures within its jurisdictional boundaries in order to provide safe, orderly, and efficient flow of aircraft. New York Center is the fifth busiest ARTCC in the United States. In 2024, New York Center handled 2,457,042 aircraft operations. It covers approximately 91,000 square miles (240,000 km^{2}) of the Northeastern United States, including parts of Maryland, New Jersey, New York, and Pennsylvania – and including the airspace over large portions of the New York and Philadelphia metropolitan areas. Its oceanic control area also covers Bermuda. Most of the flights handled by New York Center are long-distance flights flying at high altitudes and transiting the region.

The New York Air Route Traffic Control Center control area lies adjacent to those of the Boston Air Route Traffic Control Center, Cleveland Air Route Traffic Control Center, and Washington Air Route Traffic Control Center.

== History ==
The New York ARTCC was established on January 11, 1956, in Hangar 11 at John F. Kennedy International Airport. In 1963, the New York ARTCC was moved into a new, purpose-built facility at Long Island MacArthur Airport in Ronkonkoma, in Suffolk County. It was the 19th standardized ARTCC building put into operation under the FAA's modernization program started in 1960.

The new facility was commissioned on July 21, 1963, and it was formally dedicated early that September. It was designed to be able to withstand a nuclear attack from the Soviet Union and included the FAA's first real-time solid state computer used for air traffic control purposes; protection against a Soviet nuclear attack was, furthermore, one of the key reasons cited in favor of the facility's erection. The New York ARTCC facility was built at a cost of $15 million (1963 USD).

In August 1981 many air traffic controllers picketed outside the New York ARTCC facility in support of the Professional Air Traffic Controllers Organization labor union. The protests were in response to Ronald Reagan's efforts in killing the PATCO labor union.

In 1999, the facility underwent an extensive modernization project. As part of the project, many of the facility's electronic & technological components – including display screens and computers, were replaced with more modern and efficient ones.

On March 17, 2001, the Federal Aviation Administration proposed closing & merging the existing New York Air Route Traffic Control Center and New York TRACON offices, moving them into a new, consolidated Long Island facility; these plans never went forward. Similar discussions continued over the years, with proposals for a new "New York Integrated Control Facility" being built within 150 miles of New York City – but in 2014, these plans, too, were ultimately called off.

Controllers at New York Center made direct communications with American Flight 11 and United Flight 175 on September 11, 2001, following the transfer of communications to ZNY from Boston Center. Several New York Center controllers who were on duty at the time of the hijackings aided the investigators and provided officials with their accounts of what went on during the events and what they heard through the air traffic communications. New York Center also helped the United States Military during the attacks.

In 2011, a scandal was uncovered, in which it was revealed that several controllers at New York ARTCC were distracted and not doing their jobs while on duty, and that many of the facility's officials were aware of the problem but chose not to do anything about it, despite the behavior nearly causing collisions of large commercial aircraft. Some workers had previously tried to rectify the issue but were threatened by some of their supervisors and other colleagues at the facility. This led to officials in Washington getting involved, and the management was subsequently overhauled.

In March 2020, New York Center temporarily closed after a controller tested positive for COVID-19. The closure caused severe air traffic disruptions across the region, and resulted in all flights to and from the New York and Philadelphia area airports to be temporarily halted.

In the early 2020s, following COVID-19, New York Center was experiencing staffing shortages, leading to temporary limits on the number of flights able to operate within the airspace and leading to occasional delays & ground halts.

== 9/11 tape recording controversy ==
In 2004, New York ARTCC came under federal scrutiny after it was discovered that a tape made by air traffic controllers at the facility following the terrorist attacks on September 11, 2001 was intentionally destroyed several months after it was made. Several controllers at the facility – including controllers who were directly dealing with two of the hijacked planes – made the recording in the facility's basement starting just before noon on September 11, 2001, in order to document and recall the events and their accounts of the events which had just unfolded; each controller spoke on the tape for between five and ten minutes. While a union agreement was reached, in which the tape would be destroyed after the controllers would provide the information through written statements, a quality assurance manager for the facility hand-destroyed the tape a few months after its creation, before a written transcript of the tape could be produced and before anyone could listen to it – and the officials at New York Center never told higher-up FAA officials of the tape recording's existence.

== Sectors ==
The following is the center sectors staffed on a daily to weekly basis at the New York Air Route Traffic Control Center.

=== Area A (South) ===
- Sector 8 (BRNAN / High) - 124.775 (Big Flat, PA RCAG)
- Sector 9 (Westminster / High) - 134.325 (Millville, NJ RCAG)
- Sector 10 (Harrisburg / High) - 133.475 (Big Flat, PA RCAG)
- Sector 25 (Modena / Low) - 135.450 (Modena, PA RCAG)
- Sector 26 (Lancaster / Low) - 120.025 (Joliet, PA RCAG)
- Sector 27 (Middletown / Low) - 132.200 (Big Flat, PA RCAG)

=== Area B (Mid) ===
- Sector 39 (PARKE / Low) - 132.100 (Flint Hill, PA RCAG)
- Sector 42 (East Texas / High) - 127.175 (Matawan, NJ RcAG)
- Sector 55 (Yardley / Low) - 134.600 (Flint Hill, PA RCAG)
- Sector 56 (Kennedy / High) - 125.325 (Matawan, NJ RCAG)
- Sector 67 (DIXIE / Low) - 118.975 (Colts Neck, NJ RCAG)

=== Area C (North) ===
- Sector 34 (Elmira / High) - 132.175 (Elk Mountain, NJ RCAG)
- Sector 35 (Huguenot / Low) - 132.600 (Huguenot, NY RCAG)
- Sector 36 (Sparta / Low) - 133.150 (Sparta, NJ RCAG)
- Sector 49 (Stony Fork / High) - 121.325 (North Mountain, PA RCAG)
- Sector 50 (Binghamton / Low) - 133.350 (Sayre, PA RCAG)
- Sector 51 (Lake Henry / Low) - 134.450 (Elk Mountain, PA RCAG)

=== Area D (West) ===
- Sector 72 (BURNI / High) - 127.725 (Williamsport, PA RCAG)
- Sector 73 (Phillipsburg / High) - 132.875 (Phillipsburg, PA RCAG)
- Sector 74 (Broadway / Low) - 132.150 (North Mountain, PA RCAG)
- Sector 75 (Milton / High) - 128.575 (North Mountain, PA RCAG)
- Sector 91 (Williamsport / Low) - 134.800 (Phillipsburg, PA RCAG)
- Sector 91 - A (Clearence Delivery for KUNV and KIPT)
- Sector 92 (Pottstown / Low) - 124.625 (Flint Hill, PA RCAG)
- Sector 93 (Swissdale) - 123.625 (Phillipsburg, PA RCAG)

=== Area E & F (East + Oceanic) ===
- Sector 65 (JOBOC / High) - 125.925 (Barnstable, MA Site)
- Sector 66 (MANTA / Low) - 128.300 (Ship Bottom, NJ RCAG)
- Sector 80 (COCOA / High) - 119.100 (St David, Bermuda RCAG)
- Sector 81 (HILDY / High) - 128.500 (St David, Bermuda RCAG)
- Sector 82 (KATHY / Low) - 126.025 (Manteo, NC RCAG)
- Sector 83 (HANRI / High) - 133.525 (Wilmington, NC RCAG)
- Sector 85 (Atlantic / High) - 121.125 (Douglaston, NY RCAG)
- Sector 86 (Atlantic / High) - 133.500 (Barnegat, NJ RCAG)
