= Pushing Tin =

1999 film by Mike Newell

- Theatrical release poster
- Directed by: Mike Newell
- Screenplay by: Glen Charles; Les Charles
- Based on: "Something's Got to Give" by Darcy Frey
- Produced by: Art Linson
- Starring: John Cusack; Billy Bob Thornton; Cate Blanchett; Angelina Jolie; Jake Weber
- Cinematography: Gale Tattersall
- Edited by: Jon Gregory
- Music by: Anne Dudley; Chris Seefried
- Production companies: Fox 2000 Pictures; Regency Enterprises
- Distributed by: 20th Century Fox
- Release date: April 23, 1999
- Running time: 124 minutes
- Country: United States
- Language: English
- Budget: $33 million
- Box office: $8.4 million

Pushing Tin is a 1999 American comedy-drama film directed by Mike Newell. It centers on Nick Falzone (John Cusack), a cocky air traffic controller who quarrels over proving "who's more of a man" with fellow employee Russell Bell (Billy Bob Thornton). The film is loosely based on the real-world New York TRACON radar facility. The film was produced by Fox 2000 Pictures and Regency Enterprises and released on April 23, 1999, by 20th Century Fox. Pushing Tin received mixed reviews from critics and was a box-office failure, grossing $8.4 million against a $33 million budget. The original music score was composed by Anne Dudley and Chris Seefried.

== Plot ==
Nick "The Zone" Falzone and his fellow air traffic controllers at the New York TRACON pride themselves on their ability to handle being a controller for one of the busiest airspaces in the country, even boasting of the 50% drop-out rate for new additions to staff unable to cope with the pressure. The group is joined by Russell Bell, a veteran of TRACONs in the Western US.

Russell quickly proves to be exceptionally capable of handling the increased workload using unorthodox and risky methods. Nick feels challenged by the new controller's ability to outperform him at seemingly every task. He warns his supervisor Russell is a loose cannon, especially after discovering that Russell once stood on a runway to allow himself to be violently propelled by a landing commercial airliner's wake turbulence.

At a supermarket, Nick encounters Russell's despondent young wife Mary, who is sobbing over a grocery cart full of alcohol. In consoling her, he ends up at the Bells' house, where they cheat on their respective spouses. Several days later, Mary informs Nick that she immediately told Russell about their one-night stand and that the confession has actually improved their marriage.

Fearing retaliation, Nick confronts Russell at work and is confused and surprised by his even-tempered response to the situation. Meanwhile, Nick's wife, Connie seems to become more and more intrigued by Russell, and Nick becomes increasingly paranoid that he will eventually seek revenge by having sex with her.

While out of town for his father-in-law's funeral, Nick can't bring himself to lie when a grieving Connie challenges him to say that he has never cheated on her. As their flight home approaches New York, she sarcastically boasts that she slept with Russell. The plane then makes an odd turn, and he believes Russell is harassing him, or possibly going insane, purposely directing the plane into a dangerous storm.

Soon after going to TRACON to confront Russell, a bomb threat is called into the facility. The building is evacuated and both Nick and Russell volunteer to stay behind to handle the daunting task of landing all the planes on approach before the alleged bomb is set to go off in 26 minutes. Successfully routing all but one plane that has lost radio contact, Nick leaves the building as the deadline approaches while Russell remains inside to make contact with the plane by calling one of its passengers via Airfone. Russell is lauded as a hero for making the effort despite the threat, which turned out to be a hoax.

Russell abruptly quits and he and Mary move to Colorado. Connie leaves Nick, and his performance at work suffers; the once cocky, boastful controller is sent home after being responsible for two "deals" (near mid-air collisions) in one shift. After learning that Russell had ordered the diversion of his flight not to provoke him, but rather to clear a path to make a plane with a medical emergency on board next in line for a landing, Nick impulsively drives out to Colorado to make amends.

Nick seeks his advice on how to get his personal life back in order, but Russell is unable to make him understand with words. He instead brings Nick to a runway so that he too can experience being caught in a landing aircraft's turbulence. They engage in the stunt together, and it has a profound effect on Nick, who thanks Russell. He returns to New York, where he regains his form at work, and reconciles with Connie.

== Cast ==
- John Cusack as Nick "The Zone" Falzone
- Billy Bob Thornton as Russell Bell
- Cate Blanchett as Connie Falzone
- Angelina Jolie as Mary Bell
- Vicki Lewis as Tina Leary
- Jake Weber as Barry Plotkin
- Kurt Fuller as Ed Clabes
- Matt Ross as Ron Hewitt
- Jerry Grayson as Leo Morton
- Michael Willis as Pat Feeney
- Philip Akin as Paul
- Mike O'Malley as Pete
- Neil Crone as Tom
- Matt Gordon as Ken
- Joe Pingue as Mark
- Michael Hyatt as Trudy
- John Carroll Lynch as Doctor Freeze
- Kiersten Warren as Karen

== Production ==
In April 1997, it was reported Fox 2000 Pictures had optioned The New York Times Magazine article "Something's Got to Give" by Darcy Frey about air traffic controllers for adaptation to a feature film with Mike Newell slated to direct from a script by Cheers creators Glen and Les Charles. In September of that year, it was reported that John Cusack was in negotiations to star in the film.

== Reception ==
=== Critical response ===
On the review aggregator website Rotten Tomatoes, 48% of 66 critics' reviews are positive, with an average rating of 5.5/10. The website's consensus reads: "Solid performances by the leads, but the generic ending needs help." On Metacritic, it has a score of 47 out of 100, based on 29 critics, indicating "mixed or average reviews". Audiences surveyed by CinemaScore gave it a grade C.

Roger Ebert recommended the film. "The movie is worth seeing, for the good stuff. I'm recommending it because of the performances and the details in the air-traffic control center." Despite this, Ebert has some criticism of the plot and the ending.

=== Box office ===
It opened #4 at the box office. It grossed $8.4 million in its North American release, which did not make up for its estimated production budget of $33 million.

=== Accolades ===
The film was nominated for best casting in a feature comedy (Ellen Chenoweth) by the Casting Society of America, and was nominated for best sound editing (Colin Miller, Sue Baker, Ross Adams, Derek Holding, Jacques Leroide) by the Motion Picture Sound Editors.
