= Darcy Frey =

American writer

- Born: United States
- Occupations: Writer, English Department Faculty at Harvard University

Darcy Frey is an American writer and educator from New York. His 1994 book The Last Shot: City Streets, Basketball Dreams won awards and inspired a movie. Frey has published articles in New England Monthly, Rolling Stone, Harper's, and The New York Times Magazine.

He was a contributing editor at Harper's and The New York Times Magazine. Frey won the National Magazine Award and the Livingston Award for "The Last Shot", a 1993 article published in Harper's that Frey developed into his first book. The article was included in The Best American Essays 1994.

== Education ==
Frey graduated from Oberlin College in 1983.

== Career ==
Frey refers to his writing as "narrative non-fiction". Meticulous research and crisp prose bolster the cornerstone of his work: his eye for intriguing, sometimes obscure, subjects. For example, he observed Long Island air traffic controllers for five months to write "Something's Got to Give", a piece published in The New York Times Magazine. The article inspired the film Pushing Tin.

Frey has also written about environmental topics, such as global warming. He profiled George Divoky, a research scientist in the Arctic, for "George Divoky's Planet," which appeared in The New York Times Magazine in 2002. The article inspired the National Theatre of Great Britain's production of "Greenland" and was included in "The Best American Science Writing 2002."

Frey has taught literary nonfiction writing at the University of Chicago, Columbia University's Graduate Writing Program and Harvard University.

== The Last Shot ==
Frey published a single book entitled The Last Shot, about basketball and the game's effect on urban youth. Beginning in the summer of 1991, Frey spent nine months with members of the Abraham Lincoln High School basketball team. The school, located in Coney Island, is well known for its basketball program. One of the players Frey followed, Stephon Marbury, went on to play for the NBA's Minnesota Timberwolves, New York Knicks, and Boston Celtics, before playing in China.

Others weren't so lucky. One player, Darryl Flicking (whose name is changed to "Russell Thomas" in the book), lost his scholarship to Temple University because he couldn't surpass the 700 SAT score required to be NCAA eligible. He became homeless and an Amtrak train hit and killed him in 1999. Another player, Tchaka Shipp, works manual labor for $8.50 an hour, according to "Betrayed by the Game", a follow-up published in The New York Times Magazine in 2004.

The Last Shot reveals the demeaning aspects of urban athletics—children are tempted by the multi-millionaire lifestyle of NBA stars and become convinced of their heroic prowess, usually at the expense of their education; most don't end up with a basketball career. It also documents the harsh effects of Proposition 48, the rule that requires at least a 700 on the SAT for NCAA eligibility.
