= Remote communications outlet =

Radio transceiver

Remote communications outlets (RCO) are remote aviation band radio transceivers, established to extend the communication capabilities of Flight Information Centres (FIC) and flight service stations (FSS).

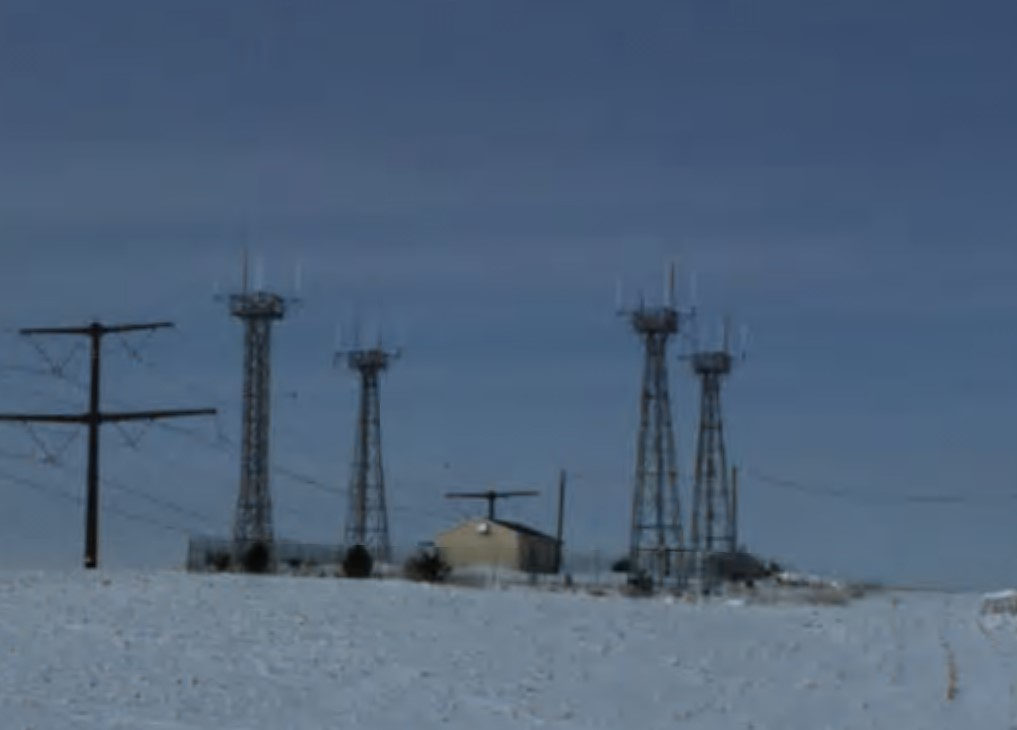
RTR Facility east of the Dubuque Regional Airport in Dubuque, Iowa.

Pilots can find RCO frequencies in charts or publications such as the Chart Supplement or Canada Flight Supplement. The RCO is used to make a radio call to the outlet as if the pilot were making the call directly to the FSS or FIC. The outlet will relay the call (and the briefer's response) automatically. RCOs are sometimes confused with RTRs, or remote transmitter/receivers. In fact, the difference between the two is subtle. While RCOs serve flight service stations, RTRs serve terminal air traffic control facilities.

RCOs and RTRs may be UHF or VHF and are divided into a variety of classes determined by the number of transmitters or receivers. Classes A through G are used mainly for air/ground communications. Class O facilities were created specifically to provide ground-to-ground communication between air traffic controllers and pilots located at satellite airports. The idea was to create a way for pilots to receive en-route clearances or departure authorizations and cancel IFR flight plans. Class O RTRs also were intended to allow pilots flying below the coverage of the primary air/ground frequency to continue to receive advisories from air traffic control. Class O facilities are non-protected outlets and are subject to prolonged outages which may go undetected and unreported.

There is also a special variant of RCO which in Canada is called a Dial-up Remote Communications Outlet (DRCO) and in the U.S. is called a Ground communication outlet (GCO). DRCOs and GCOs connect to an FIC or FSS over a phone line, and pilots initiate the connection by keying their microphones in a prescribed pattern.

== Decommissioning of some RCOs in the United States ==
In 2017, the FAA announced a final policy determination which would remove 641 of the roughly 2,100 RCOs in the conterminous United States, Hawaii and Puerto Rico. However, as of that announcement, over 95% of the outposts which use 122.2MHz, the standard FSS frequency, will be retained.

== See also ==
- Ground communication outlet
