= Markham Fire & Emergency Services =

- Established: 1970
- Headquarters: 8100 Warden Avenue Markham, Ontario, L6G 1B4
- Key people: Chief Chris Nearing

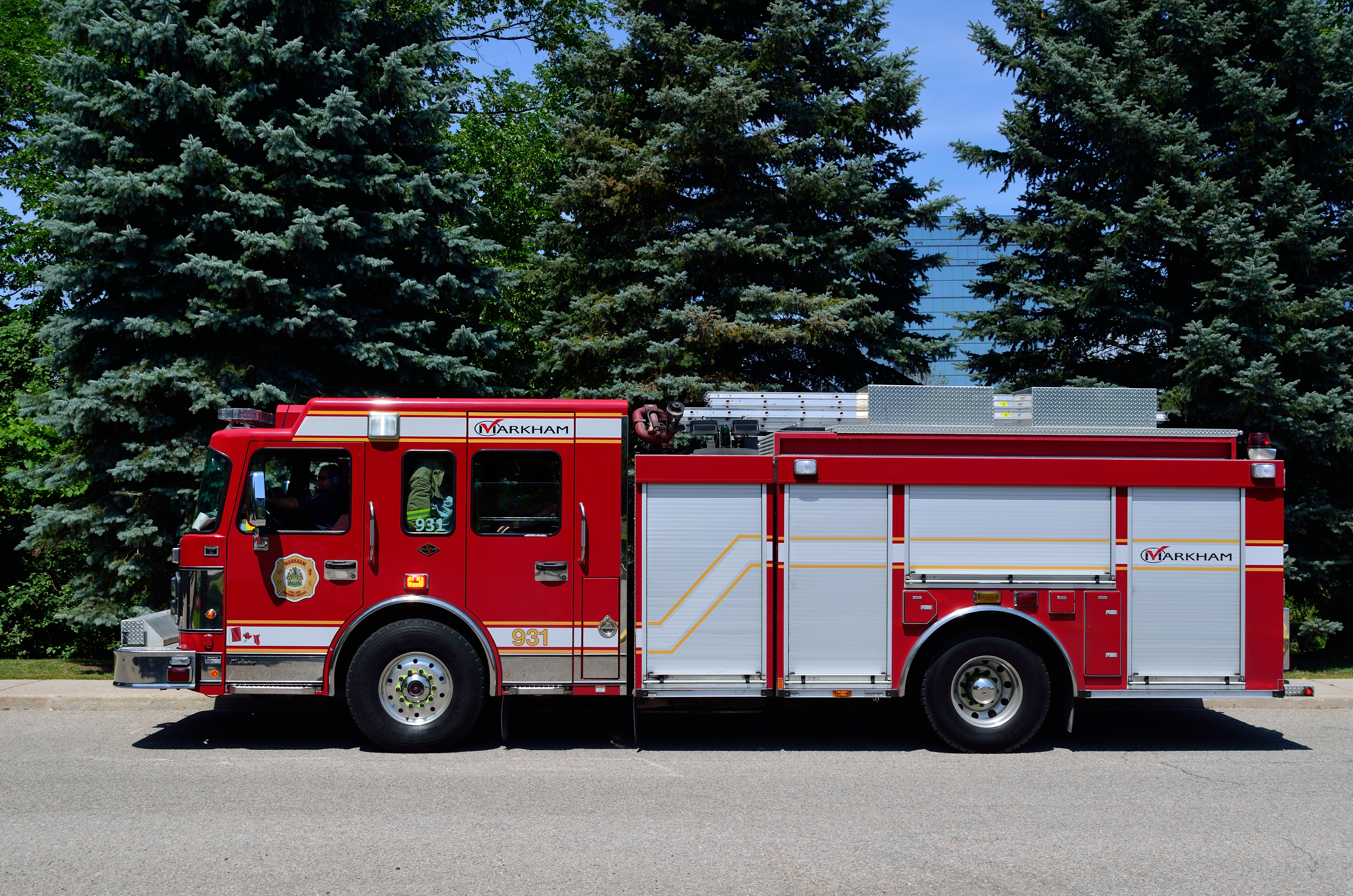
Markham Fire & Emergency Services fire truck

Markham Fire & Emergency Services is the primary provider of fire protection and emergency response services in the city of Markham, Ontario, Canada. Established in 1970.

== Services ==
Markham Fire & Emergency Services offers a wide range of services to the residents of Markham, including:

- Fire suppression
- Emergency medical services
- Technical rescue
- Hazardous materials response
- Public education and fire prevention programs

The department operates multiple fire stations strategically located throughout the city to ensure quick response times to emergencies.

== Leadership ==
The current Chief of Markham Fire & Emergency Services is Chief Chris Nearing.

== Community involvement ==
Markham Fire & Emergency Services is actively involved in the community, participating in various outreach programs, safety demonstrations, and public events. The department also collaborates with local schools, businesses, and organizations to promote fire safety and emergency preparedness.

== See also ==
- York Regional Police
