= Flight Information Centre =

Flight Information Centres (FICs) are centres employing flight service specialists responsible for the management and dissemination of flight safety related information operated by Nav Canada.

Nav Canada's FIC and flight service stations (FSS) use a network of remote communications outlets (RCOs) strategically located to provide maximum coverage and assistance to aircraft flying in all areas of Canada. Flight service specialists staff these stations providing essential aviation-related information to support mainly general aviation, commercial and private. Pilots can contact FICs to obtain any pre-flight information required 24 hours a day. The specialist will provide callers with an interpretation of the latest weather reports, forecasts, satellite images and weather radar, copies of the latest Notice To Airmen (NOTAMs), and file, modify, open, or close a flight plan. Only a few FICs provide for face to face briefings but all can be contacted on a toll free number, or via radio using an RCO (located at numerous aerodromes). Historically, the common en route frequency of 126.7 has been used to contact the FIC, but as general radio traffic has increased, the congestion on that frequency has resulted in a plan by Nav Canada to change over a significant number of RCOs to one of four dedicated FIC frequencies - 123.275, 123.375, 123.475, or 123.55 MHz. When this occurs in a particular area, 126.7 will no longer be monitored by the FIC, however, they will retain broadcast capabilities on 126.7 to transmit urgent messages such as SIGMETs or to aid in a search for an overdue aircraft.

== History ==
In Canada, 5 FICs have replaced some of the Flight Service Stations. 54 Flight Service Stations remain in operation, mainly at mandatory frequency airports. The FIC concept was conceived from a program begun in the 1990s by Transport Canada, and continued by Nav Canada after the company's inception in 1996. The original plan had a 20-year span and would have included 22 hubs (FICs). Nav Canada decided to accelerate the process and further centralize the project into 8 FICs.

With the removal of FIC duties from Yellowknife, and the closures of North Bay FIC, Halifax FIC, and Winnipeg FIC, there are 5 FICs across Canada as of 2022.
