= Druxy's =

Canadian restaurant chain

- Company type: Privately Owned
- Industry: Fast food
- Founded: Toronto, Ontario, Canada (1976; 50 years ago)
- Headquarters: Toronto, Ontario, Canada
- Key people: Bruce, Harold and Peter Druxerman
- Products: Deli Sandwiches
- Website: www.druxys.com

Druxy's is a Canadian chain of quick service delicatessen restaurants with 48 locations across the country. They offer a wide selection of sandwiches made with various meats on an assortment of breads. They are privately owned and were founded in 1976.

== History ==
Druxy's opened its first restaurant in the fall of 1976 in the head office of the Royal Bank of Canada at the food court in the Royal Bank Plaza, situated in the heart of Toronto's financial district. Two additional locations opened soon after in the Toronto Eaton Centre and the Sheppard Centre.

In 2010, Druxy's hired Spinning Wheel Design to change their logo from a man holding sausages to a simple text based logo.

As of July 2016, the company has approximately 35 locations in the Greater Toronto Area, as well as one each in Barrie and Niagara Falls.

== Williams Fresh Café Acquisition ==
In February 2016, Druxy's acquired the Williams Fresh Café chain of franchises, consisting of 26 locations throughout Southwestern Ontario. While the restaurants will continue to operate as separate brands, opportunities will be explored that capitalize on strengths the different menus have to offer.

"Williams comes to us with 26 locations, a dedicated group of amazing franchisee owners and employees and a broad and loyal customer base", said Bruce Druxerman, President of DRUXY’S Inc. "We intend to enhance this legacy and guide new growth for the Williams brand."
