= New York TRACON =

Air traffic control center in Westbury, NY

Agency overview
- Jurisdiction: Much of the New York metropolitan area
- Headquarters: 1515 Stewart Avenue, Westbury, New York 11590; East Garden City, New York; 40°44′17″N 73°35′12″W
- Parent agency: Federal Aviation Administration

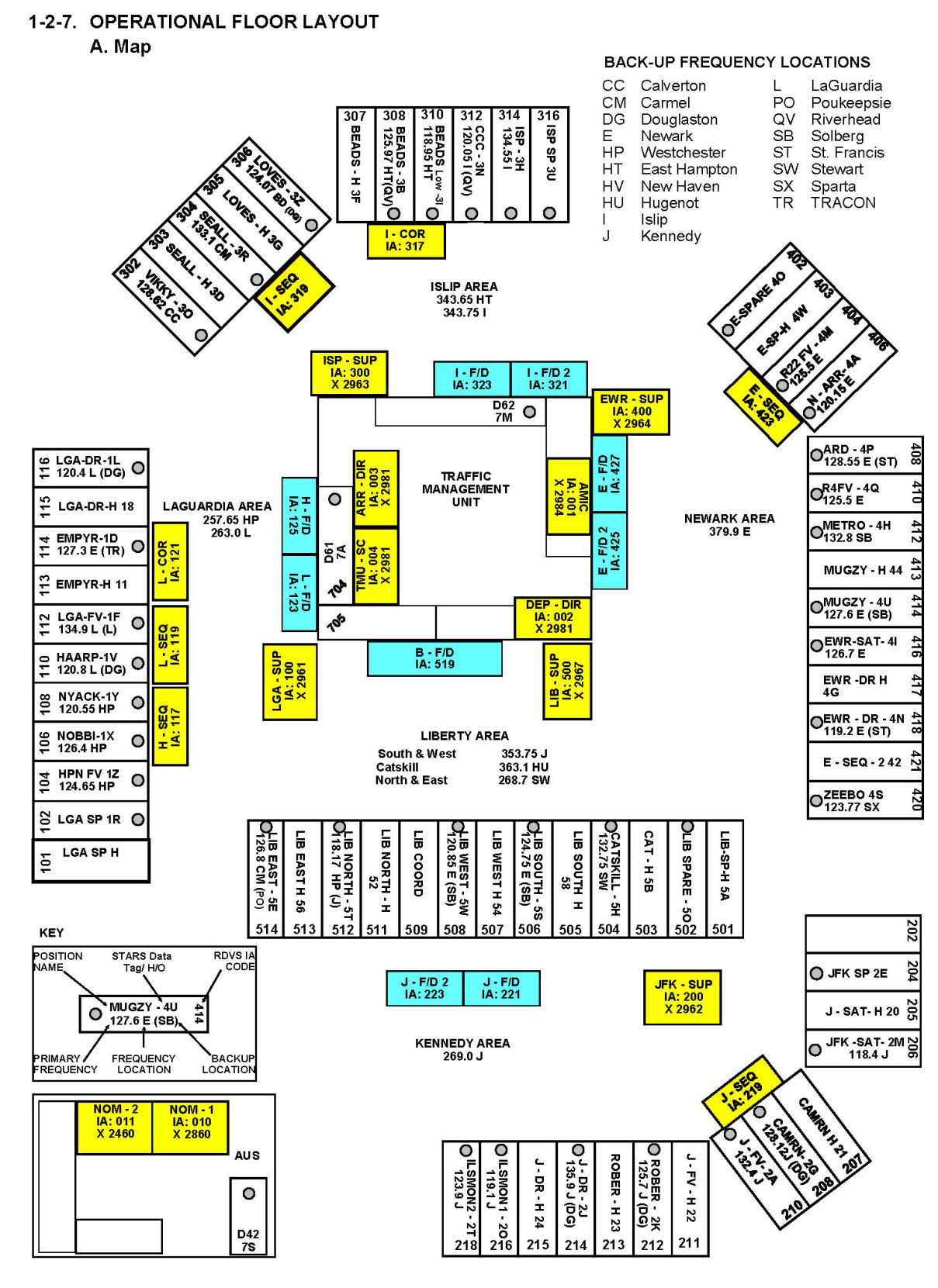
Floorplan of controller stations at the New York TRACON

New York TRACON (NYT or N90, radio communications New York Approach or New York Departure) is a terminal radar approach control (TRACON) facility located in East Garden City, New York.

== Overview ==
The primary responsibility of the New York TRACON is the safe, orderly, and expeditious flow of arrival, departure, and en-route traffic. N90 is responsible for two major airports, all located within the same New York Class B airspace: John F. Kennedy International Airport and LaGuardia Airport. Additionally, N90 is responsible for dozens of smaller but busy fields, including Long Island MacArthur Airport, Tweed New Haven Regional Airport, and Westchester County Airport. N90 also controls the large number of VFR aircraft that fly through the New York Class B airspace every day. New York TRACON previously handled arrival and departure for Newark Liberty International Airport and Teterboro Airport, however, due to staffing shortages at New York TRACON, in June 2024 the Philadelphia TRACON was assigned the Newark area under the new callsign Newark Approach and Newark Departure. New York TRACON is the second largest TRACON facility in the United States. As of February 2026, New York TRACON handled 1,933,029 aircraft operations, handling more aircraft than 5 of the 22 Area control centers in the United States.

The New York TRACON is a Level 12 facility and one of seven "Large TRACONs" currently existing throughout the United States. The others include the Atlanta Large TRACON (A80), the Boston Consolidated TRACON (A90), the Potomac Consolidated TRACON (PCT), the Southern California TRACON (SCT), the Lone Star TRACON (D10), and the Northern California TRACON (NCT). Unlike smaller TRACONs which only utilize one radar, the New York TRACON uses many different airport surveillance radar(ASR) sites, including:

- Westchester County Airport (HPN)
- Long Island MacArthur Airport (ISP)
- John F. Kennedy International Airport (JFK)
- Stewart International Airport (SWF)

== Area breakdown ==
The New York TRACON is divided into five areas. Sectors, along with their frequencies and radio sites, are given below.

=== LaGuardia Area ===
The LaGuardia area of the TRACON controls LaGuardia Airport and several busy satellite airports and heliports: JRA (West 30th Street Heliport) JRB (Wall Street Heliport), 6N5 (East 34th Street Heliport). To the North is HPN (Westchester County Airport) and DXR (Danbury Municipal Airport).

- 100 LGA - SUP (Supervisor)
- 101 LGA SP H
- 102 LGA SP 1S / 19
- 104 HPN FV 1Z
- 106 NOBBI - 1X—126.4000 at HPN
- 108 NYACK - 1Y—120.5500 at HPN
- 110 HAARP - 1V—120.8000 at LGA Backup at Douglaston
- 112 LGA - FV - 1F—134.9000 at LGA Backup also at LGA
- 113 EMPYR - H 11 (Handoff)
- 114 EMPYR - 1D—127.3000 at EWR Backup at Mount Freedom
- 115 LGA - DR - H 18 (Handoff)
- 116 LGA - DR - 1 L -- 120.4000 at LGA Backup at Douglaston
- 117 H-SEQ (Sequencer)
- 119 L-SEQ (Sequencer)
- 121 L-COR (Coordinator)
- 123 L - F/D LaGuardia Flight Data
- 125 H - F/D HPN Flight Data

257.65000 at White Plains

263.0000 at LaGuardia

=== Kennedy Area ===
The Kennedy area controls John F. Kennedy International Airport and its only major satellite, Republic Airport. This area controls many international flights from Europe because Kennedy is known in the aviation community as the "Gateway to America".

- 200 JFK - SUP (Supervisor)
- 202 SP1 2V/2E 126.2200 at JFK
- 204 SP2 2D/2Y 127.9200 at JFK
- 205 J-SAT-H 20
- 206 JFK - SAT - 25 118.4 at JFK
- 207 CAMRN H 22
- 208 CAMRN - 2G 128.1250 at JFK backup at Douglaston
- 210 J - FV - 2A 132.4000 at JFK
- 211 J - FV - H25
- 212 ROBER - 2K 125.7000 at JFK backup at Douglaston
- 213 ROBER - H23
- 214 J - DR - 2J 135.9000 at JFK backup at Douglaston
- 215 J - DR - H24
- 216 ILSMON1 - 2O 119.100 at JFK
- 218 ISLMON2 - 2T 123.9 at JFK
- 219 J-SEQ (Sequencer)
- 221 JFK - F/D (Flight Data)
- 223 JFK F/D 2 (Flight Data)

269.0000 at JFK

=== Islip Area ===
The Islip area controls all low altitude flights along Long Island including Long Island MacArthur Airport (formerly known as Islip Airport), East Hampton Airport, Brookhaven Airport, Francis S. Gabreski Airport, Sikorsky Memorial Airport, Tweed New Haven Airport, Montauk Airport, Waterbury–Oxford Airport, and Chester Airport.

- 300 ISP Supervisor
- 302 VIKKY - 3Z 128.6200 at CCC (Calverton)
- 303 SEALL - H36
- 304 SEALL - 3R 133.100 at CMK (Carmel)
- 305 LOVES - H34
- 306 LOVES - 31 124.0750 at BDR (Bridgeport) Backup at Douglaston
- 307 BEADS - H 32
- 308 BEADS - 3B 125.9750 at HTO (Hampton) backup at QV (Riverhead)
- 310 BEADS Low - 3N 118.9500 at HTO (Hampton)
- 312 CCC - 3E 134.5500 at Islip Backup at QV (Riverhead)
- 314 ISP - 3H 120.0500 at ISP
- 316 ISP SP 3S/30
- 317 ISP COR (Coordinator)
- 319 I - SEQ (Sequencer)
- 321 I - F/D 2 (Flight Data 2)
- 323 I F/D (Flight Data)

343.6500 at HT

343.7500 at ISP

== Former areas ==
=== Newark Area ===
The Newark area of the TRACON covers Newark Liberty International Airport along with the majority of the TRACON's satellite airports including Teterboro Airport, Morristown Municipal Airport, and Essex County Airport.

In June 2024, the control over the Newark Area was transferred to Philadelphia TRACON.

- 400 EWR - SUP
- 402 E-SPARE - 4O
- 403 E-SP-H - 4W
- 404 R22 FV- 4M 125.5000 AT EWR
- 406 N-ARR- 4A 120.1500 AT EWR
- 408 ARD - 4P 128.5500 AT EWR Backup at ST (St. Francis)
- 410 R4FV - 4Q 125.5000 at EWR
- 412 METRO - 4H 132.8000 AT SBJ (Solberg)
- 413 MUGZY - H
- 414 MUGZY - 4U 127.6000 at EWR Backup at Mount Freedom
- 416 EWR - SAT - 4E 126.7000 at EWR
- 417 EWR - DR - H 4D
- 418 EWR - DR - 4N 119.2000 at EWR (Backup at St. Francis)
- 421 E - SEQ - 2
- 420 ZEEBO 4S 123.7750 at SAX Sparta
- 423 E-SEQ (Sequencer)
- 425 E - F/D 2 (Flight Data 2)
- 427 E - F/D (Flight Data)

379.9000 AT EWR

== Traffic Management Unit ==
TMU - SC

ARR - DIR

AMIC

DEP - DIR

== In popular culture ==
New York TRACON was the setting for the 1999 comedy-drama film Pushing Tin.
