= Flight service station =

Air traffic facility

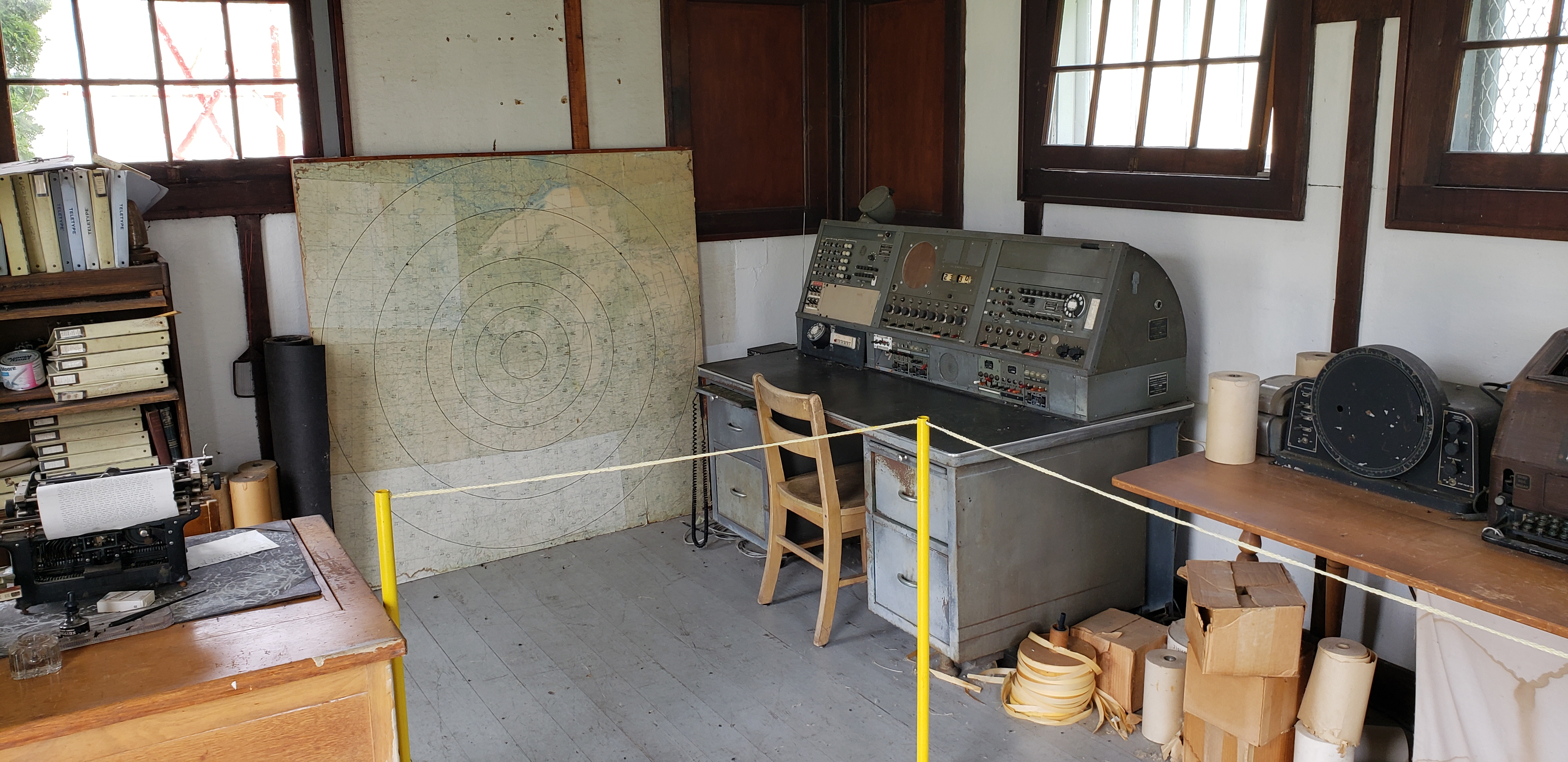
The Lone Rock Flight Service Station from 1928 to 1985, in the EAA Aviation Museum

A flight service station (FSS) is an air traffic facility that provides information and services to aircraft pilots before, during, and after flights, but unlike air traffic control (ATC), is not responsible for giving instructions or clearances or providing separation. They do, however, relay clearances from ATC for departure or approaches. The people who communicate with pilots from an FSS are referred to as flight service specialists.

The precise services offered by stations vary by country, but typical FSS services may include providing preflight briefings including weather and notices to airmen (NOTAMs); filing, opening, and closing flight plans; monitoring navigational aids (NAVAIDs); collecting and disseminating pilot reports (PIREPs) and airport surface weather observations; offering traffic advisories to aircraft on the ground or in flight; relaying instructions or clearances from air traffic control; relaying information from or about airborne aircraft to their home bases, military bases or homeland security, providing weather advisories to aircraft inflight, initiating search and rescue on missing VFR aircraft, and providing assistance in an emergency. In many countries, flight service stations also operate at mandatory frequency airports to help co-ordinate traffic in the absence of air traffic controllers, and may take over a control tower frequency at a controlled airport when the tower is closed.

In most cases, it is possible to reach flight service stations either by radio in flight, or by telephone on the ground. Recently, some countries, such as Canada and the United States, have been consolidating flight services into large regional centres, replacing former local flight service stations with remote communications outlets (RCOs) connected to the centres.

== Flight services in different countries ==
=== Flight services in the United States ===
As of 2005, the FAA federal contractor for their flight service function throughout the continental U.S., Hawaii and the Caribbean was Lockheed Martin (LMFS). Leidos has taken over as of 17 August 2016, following a merger with Lockheed Martin Information Systems & Global Solutions Business. (AFSS used to refer to the Automated Flight Service Station.) The FAA still oversees flight service in Alaska. At this time Leidos operates two large hub facilities. Flight service duties and responsibilities are divided into preflight, inflight and flight data. The services are provided at no charge to the flying public. Preflight – Primarily responsible for filing flight plans, giving preflight weather briefings, and providing information concerning air traffic, they also take information from pilots coming into the US to notify the United States Customs Service that an aircraft is inbound. The Leidos call tree has the ability to route calls to any flight service facility in the country.

Inflight – which the pilots call “Radio” (which is the ICAO standard callsign for a generic air-to-ground advisory station and employed for a number of functions worldwide), activates, cancels, and alters VFR flight plans. They take position reports and changes of destination for both civilian and military aircraft. They relay IFR and SVFR clearances to aircraft on the ground either by phone or through their frequencies when there is no direct method of communication with the air traffic control facility governing the area. At border stations, Radio also takes information from aircraft crossing into the U.S., and issues transponder squawk codes to VFR aircraft which identify them to Homeland Security's radar. They relay information on forest fires to the U.S. Forest Service. Inflight monitors VHF and UHF frequencies, VOR voices, and emergency frequencies – from 60 to 100 different frequencies per area. The United States FSS radio frequencies are published in several FAA publications, including airport facility directories (AFD), VFR sectional maps, and IFR low and high altitude en route charts. When pilots have an inflight emergency, such as being lost, having smoke in the cockpit, or having low fuel and needing directions to the nearest airport with fuel, they call flight service for assistance. In addition, some (often more remote) airports now also have stations called AFIS in accordance with international nomenclature, but this is implemented as an ATIS or AWOS-like recording, not a live service. The call sign "RADIO" is inherited from early radio communications stations that relayed ATC instructions and clearances at a time when enroute control did not yet have its own radio equipment, but rather relied on teletext links with these stations. In later years, many of these functions were taken over directly by enroute ATC facilities, but the name stuck, giving rise to the modern FSS concept.

Radio can take flight plans and give pre-flight briefings over the radio in extenuating circumstances.

Leidos until early 2016 had another inflight position called Flight Watch, which was dedicated to updating weather for aircraft en route. Radio now performs that function. Enroute Flight Advisory Service (EFAS) or Flight Watch was designed to give pilots who are already airborne updates on weather during their current flight, and take pilots' reports or PIREPS, which they enter into the computer for transmission to the National Weather Service.

The Flight Data position in flight service is an informational clearinghouse that pilots seldom speak to unless they are calling for an IFR clearance by telephone. Flight Data is responsible for coordination with other air traffic facilities, U.S. Customs and Homeland security, the Fire Service, military baseops, airport managers and law enforcement.

Search and rescue activities are initiated at Flight Data when VFR aircraft become overdue. Weather observers and airport tower operators call them to input weather observations or pilot reports to the National Weather Service. LMFS added an option for pilots in 2013 called Surveillance Enhanced Search and Rescue, SE-SAR, which allows them to keep track of en route aircraft via satellite. Flight Data issues some types of Notices to Airmen (NOTAMs) through the FAA's E-Notam II computer system.

Flight Service has experienced large reduction in the volume of requests for advisory services due to advancement in mobile technologies. In the mid-1980s, flight service stations received 22,000 service requests per day across this network, while as of 2025 they receive fewer than 300 per day. In turn, from over 350 Flight Service stations with over 3,000 employees 40 years ago, there are only two facilities with fewer than 200 specialists in 2025. In 2017, FAA decommissioned 641 flight service station frequencies, resulting in an 2.5 million annual cost saving. In 2025, FAA is seeking public comments to decommission all remaining frequencies for the continental United States.

=== Flight services in Canada ===
In Canada, Flight Information Centres (FIC) monitor the FISE frequencies (frequency 126.7 MHz is for broadcasts) as well as 121.5 MHz, the emergency frequency. However, Canadian FIC have phased out the use of 126.7 MHz for FISE (en route flight information) and are instead utilizing discrete frequencies. This is to decrease the frequency congestion often experienced on 126.7. These frequencies are found in the Canada Flight Supplement (CFS).

Unlike in the United States, even for VFR flights, pilots are required to file a flight plan or have a flight itinerary with a responsible person for any flight greater than 25 nm from the departure aerodrome. Also, in Canada, flight plans are opened automatically at the estimated time of departure (ETD). Flight information centres play a prominent role managing flight plans, collecting position reports from pilots en route, and initiating commsearch procedures to locate pilots who have not closed flight plans.

There is no per-use charge for flight services, but aircraft owners are required to pay Nav Canada a daily or annual fee, depending on aircraft weight, to support all air traffic services, both FSS and air traffic control (for a light private aircraft, the fee is approximately CAD 70/year). Foreign light aircraft entering Canada are billed a quarterly fee.

Canada has many mandatory frequency airports, which have enough traffic to justify special rules, but not enough to justify a control tower. Many of these airports have an onsite FSS that pilots are required to contact, while others have Remote Aerodrome Advisory Services (RAAS) provided by an FSS in a different location. Rarely, an airport will have Mandatory Frequency Area rules, but no ground station.

Until 1996, the Canadian federal government operated all air traffic services (FSS and air traffic control) through Transport Canada, a government department. Currently, a private non-profit corporation, Nav Canada, operates both FSS/FIC and air traffic control and has significantly modernized the system, which involved the closing of some local FSSs. However, the company in turn created five large Flight Information Centres (FICs) situated at airports in Halifax, Quebec City, London, Edmonton and Kamloops. These provide standard en route flight services (weather briefing, flight-planning and commsearch). FSSs provide airport advisories, vehicle control, weather observations, clearance delivery, emergency assistance, and some provide Remote Aerodrome Advisory Services. FSSs are responsible for the safe and efficient movement of aircraft on manoeuvering areas and within their designated control zone. Most FSS stations are open 24/7; some have limited hours. They are no longer responsible for flight planning, except for sending departure and arrival messages to the appropriate FIC. The FICs have assumed the responsibility for flight plans, filing, in-flight alerting, flight plan closures, interpretive weather briefings and NOTAM (NOtices To AirMen) management. The FICs also have large areas they are overseeing and have networks of RCOs, some of which are co-located with FSS or air traffic control sites. The FICs are similar in function and scope to the FAA's former automated FSS system in the United States. North Bay FIC is tied into the North American Aerospace Defense Command (NORAD) North Warning System (NWS) radar system, and has a network of 23 RCOs located across Canada's Arctic coast. Quebec City, North-Bay and Kamloops FIC also assist and oversee the "Community Aerodrome Radio Station" (CARS) program.
