= Canadian airspace =

Airspace below which Canada has jurisdiction

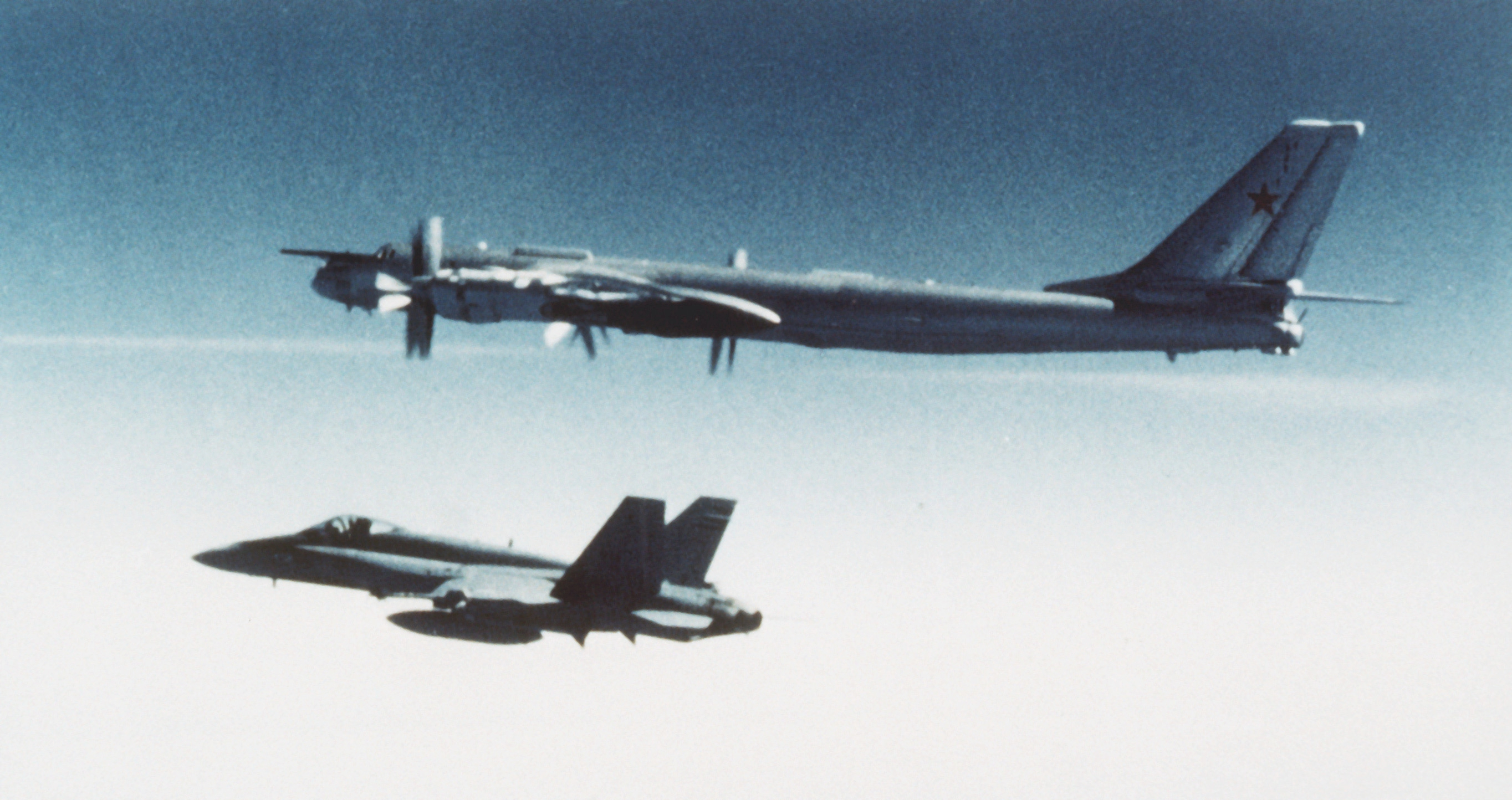
Canadian CF-18 escorts Soviet Tu-95 bomber, 1987

Canadian airspace is the region of airspace above the surface of the Earth within which Canada has jurisdiction. It falls within a region roughly defined as either the Canadian land mass, the Canadian Arctic or the Canadian archipelago, and areas of the high seas. Airspace is managed by Nav Canada and detailed information regarding exact dimensions and classification is available in the Designated Airspace Handbook which is published every fifty-six days by Nav Canada.

== Canadian Domestic Airspace ==
The "Canadian Domestic Airspace" includes all of Canada and extends out over the Pacific, Arctic, and Atlantic oceans. It is broadly divided into the "Northern Domestic Airspace" (NDA) and the "Southern Domestic Airspace" (SDA).

There are three main differences between the two areas, the most important of them being that the NDA is designated as a "standard pressure" region while the SDA is an "altimeter setting" region. This means that pilots operating in the SDA will calibrate their altimeters to atmospheric pressure according to information available at airports and through weather services. Conversely, in the NDA, pilots calibrate their altimeters to 29.92 inches of mercury (101.3 kPa) regardless of the actual atmospheric pressure. This is done because weather information is not available for all areas of the far north, so it is better that all pilots use a standard setting in order to avoid collisions.

Another major difference between the NDA and SDA is that magnetic declination is not used in the NDA. Because the North Magnetic Pole is close to the NDA (and was formerly within it), magnetic declinations can be very large and changeable from year to year. This is further complicated by the fact that magnetic north wobbles every day in an elliptical path as much as 50 miles (80 km). For these reasons, "true" tracks are always used in the NDA while magnetic tracks are frequently used in the SDA for convenience.

The final difference between the NDA and the SDA has to do with the location of Class A airspace in each region. This is explained in more detail below.

Canadian Domestic Airspace is the second-largest air navigation service by volume of air traffic in the world, after the United States.

== Airspace classes ==
There are seven classes of airspace in Canada, each designated by a letter (A through G).

- Class A airspace exists exclusively between Flight Level 180 and FL600. Only aircraft flying in terms with Instrument Flight Rules may fly in Class A airspace. It includes, therefore, the Southern Control Area, the Northern Control Area FL230 and above and the Arctic Control Area FL270 and above. It may also include any other airspace so designated by the Minister on either a permanent or temporary basis.
  - For entry into Class A airspace, an aircraft needs a functional Mode C transponder and an IFR clearance.
- Class B airspace is any controlled airspace between 12,501 ft (3,810 m) or at and above the MEA, whichever is higher, up to 17,999 ft (5,486 m). Occasionally, Class B airspace exists in other locations, though this is unusual.
  - For entry into Class B airspace, an aircraft needs a functional Mode C transponder and either an IFR or a CVFR (Controlled VFR) clearance.
- Class C airspace is usually a control zone (CZ) for a large airport. These areas usually have a 10-nautical-mile (19 km) radius and a height of up to 12,500 ft above aerodrome elevation (AAE).
  - For entry into a Class C control zone, an aircraft needs a functional Mode C transponder and an ATC clearance.
- Class D airspace is usually a control zone for smaller airports or aerodromes that has a 5-nautical-mile (9.3 km) radius and a height of 3,000 ft (910 m) AAE. Airports in extremely busy airspace may have only a 3-nautical-mile (5.6 km) radius control zone.
  - For entry into a Class D control zone, an aircraft needs to contact ATC. Some Class D control zones require transponders, and NORDO flight is not permitted at night in a Class D zone.
- Class E airspace is used for low-level flight routes and for aerodromes with very little traffic. ATC is available, but is not required. Some Class D control zones change to Class E at night if the control tower shuts down. It is also high level controlled airspace above FL600. See Other Important Features Below
  - Any aircraft may fly in Class E airspace.
- Class F airspace is special use airspace. Any Class F zone will be designated either CYR, CYD, or CYA. CYR stands for restricted, CYD means danger (usually used for CYR areas over international waters), and CYA stands for advisory. CYA zones will also have a letter identifying the type of activity in the zone: A – aerobatics, F – aircraft testing, H – hang gliding, M – military, P – parachuting, S – soaring, T – training.
  - For entry into a CYR or CYD zone, an aircraft needs the permission of the operating authority. Pilots may enter CYA zones at their discretion, but are encouraged to avoid them unless taking part in the activity.
- Any airspace that is not designated is Class G airspace. This airspace is uncontrolled, and ATC is not usually available (though exceptions are made).
  - Any aircraft may fly in Class G airspace.

Airspace classes A through E are controlled. Class F can be controlled or uncontrolled. Class G is always uncontrolled. Airspace is managed by Transport Canada and detailed information regarding exact dimensions and classification is available in the Designated Airspace Handbook which is published every fifty-six days by NAV CANADA.

== Other important features of control zones and controlled airspace ==
Some control zones have unique procedures because of terrain or air traffic demands. These procedures are published in the Canada Flight Supplement. From the supplement "Class E* All high level controlled airspace above FL600 within the SCA, NCA and ACA. Also, low level airways, low level fixed RNAV routes, CAEs, transition areas or CZs established without an operating control tower may be classified Class E airspace." So uncontrolled airports like Sarnia (CYZR) and others may appear to be mischaracterized as control zones since the Canadian Air Regulations (CARs) define a CZ as "controlled airspace that is so specified in the Designated Airspace Handbook (DAH) and that extends upwards vertically from the surface of the earth up to and including 3,000 feet AGL, unless otherwise specified" in that handbook.

However, this apparent conflict is resolved since the DAH is specifically authorized to define airspace classification. The CARs definition of controlled airspace is "...within which air traffic control service is provided;". So when air traffic control is not provided it appears it should not be a control zone. The DAH defines Class G airspace as "Airspace shall be classified G if it has not been designated A, B, C, D, E or F." There is actually no definition of "uncontrolled airspace" other than that, so by inferred definition CYZR is controlled airspace below 700 ft to 5 nmi beneath a Class G, transition airspace out to 15 nmi). The 700 ft is the base of this overlaying Class E transition airspace which is controlled up to FL125. DAH also defines "Class B, C, D or E equivalent" airspace but that specifically refers MTCAs which are military terminal control areas.

Bottom line is the CARs definition of CZ and controlled airspace specifically allows the DAH to further define certain "Class E uncontrolled airports" as a control zone as long as they have at least one navigation aid and an instrument approach procedure that originates in Class E transition controlled airspace.

Another important feature of Canadian airspace is the air defence identification zone (ADIZ) that surrounds North America.

=== Saint Pierre and Miquelon ===
The terminal control areas of the French islands of Saint Pierre and Miquelon are located within Canadian airspace. They are as follows:

- The class E airspace ranges from 6000 feet AGL to 12,500 feet within the area demarcated by a line beginning at 47°19′57″N 55°57′16″W and ending at 46°55′53″N 56°07′13″W, then running clockwise along a circle with a radius of 10 miles centred on 46°45′47″N 56°10′27″W.
- The Control Area for Saint Pierre is the airspace to 2000 feet (2000 feet AAE) within a circle with a radius of 6 miles centred on 46°45′47″N 56°10′27″W.
- The area above 12,000 feet is controlled by Nav Canada.
