= Uncontrolled airspace =

Airspace without an air traffic control service

In aviation, uncontrolled airspace is airspace in which an air traffic control (ATC) service is not deemed necessary or cannot be provided for practical reasons. It is the opposite of controlled airspace. It is that portion of the airspace that has not been designated as Control Area, Control Zone, Terminal Control Area or Transition Area.

According to the airspace classes set by the International Civil Aviation Organization (ICAO), the uncontrolled classes of airspace are class F and G. Uncontrolled airspace does not require a clearance to enter.

ATC does not exercise any executive authority in uncontrolled airspace, but may provide basic information services to aircraft in radio contact. Aircraft entering controlled airspace from uncontrolled airspace will need a clearance from the relevant ATC unit in order to do so. Aircraft in uncontrolled airspace will not receive separation from other flights but may receive an information service, if available and practical.

== Class F ==
In Class F airspace, IFR and VFR flights are permitted. Participating IFR flights may receive an air traffic advisory service and all flights are eligible for a flight information service on request.

Class F is rarely encountered in ICAO member-states' airspace systems. In the UK, it was formerly a hybrid between class E (controlled) and G (uncontrolled) as Advisory Routes (ADRs). In the UK, all airspace previously designated as class F was re-assigned to either class E or G on 13 November 2014.

== Class G ==
In Class G airspace, IFR and VFR flights are permitted. Participating IFR flights may receive a flight information service on request.

Individual countries designate different portions of airspace as class G—in the UK, for example—airspace above FL660 (Flight Level 660 or 66,000 feet) is uncontrolled and belonging to class G, while in the US, any airspace above FL600 (60,000 feet) is designated as class E and therefore controlled. Similarly, large parts of lower airspace in the UK are uncontrolled while in the US any airspace above 700–1200 feet AGL up to FL145 (14,500 feet) MSL, not designated as any other class of airspace (A–D) belongs to class E and is controlled.
