= En Route Automation Modernization =

FAA air traffic control system

The En Route Automation Modernization (ERAM) system architecture replaces the En Route Host computer system and its backup. ERAM provides all of today's functionality and:

- Adds new capabilities needed to support the evolution of US National Airspace System.
- Improves information security and streamlines traffic flow at US international borders.
- Processes flight radar data.
- Provides communications support.
- Generates display data to air traffic controllers.
- The display system provides real-time electronic aeronautical information and efficient data management.
- Provides a fully functional backup system, precluding the need to restrict operations in the event of a primary failure.
- The backup system provides the National Transportation Safety Board-recommended safety alerts, altitude warnings and conflict alerts.
- Improves surveillance by using a greater number and variety of surveillance sources.
- Detects and alerts air traffic controllers when aircraft are flying too close together for both safety and long term planning.
- ERAM simultaneously supports many operating modes and complex airspace configurations, driven by thousands of users who want to use the airspace differently.
- Allows more radars and flights than the old Host Computer System which ERAM replaces.

The open system architecture enables the use of future capabilities to efficiently handle traffic growth, and ensure a more stable and supportable system.

== Implementation ==
The FAA deployed ERAM at 20 Air Route Traffic Control Centers (ARTCCs), the Williams J. Hughes Technical Center, and the FAA Academy.

Step 1, 2006
Replace the current En Route computer backup system with Enhanced Backup Surveillance.
Step 2, 2007
Provide controllers real-time electronic access to weather data, aeronautical data, air traffic control procedures documents, Notices to Airmen (NOTAMs), Pilot Reports (PIREPs) and other information with the En Route Information Display System (ERIDS).
Step 3, 2009
Replace the current En Route Host computer air traffic control with a fully redundant, state of the art system that enables new capabilities and requires no stand-alone backup system.

== Nationwide adoption ==
By the end of September 2011, ERAM was in continuous use at two relatively low-traffic centers, the Salt Lake City (ZLC) and Seattle (ZSE) ARTCCs. The project was over budget and behind schedule, and the original deployment dates were pushed back several times. While the system was deemed suitable for operational use, many workarounds were in place while awaiting software updates. Testing and dry runs continued while software bugs and requirements changes were worked out.

As of March 2015, the Operational Readiness Decision (ORD) for ERAM has been declared at the Salt Lake City, Seattle, Denver (ZDV), Minneapolis (ZMP), Albuquerque (ZAB), Chicago (ZAU), Los Angeles (ZLA), Kansas City (ZKC), Houston (ZHU), Indianapolis (ZID), Oakland (ZOA), Boston (ZBW), Miami (ZMA), Cleveland (ZOB), Fort Worth (ZFW), Memphis (ZME), Atlanta (ZTL), Jacksonville (ZJX) and New York (ZNY) ARTCCs. ORD marks the point after which the legacy HOST Computer System can be decommissioned. In addition to the ORD sites, continuous operations have been declared at the Washington (ZDC) ARTCC, meaning all 20 ARTCCs in the CONUS are now using ERAM 24/7 to control en route air traffic over an area covering more than 3 million square miles.

In April 2014, the ERAM system at the Los Angeles ARTCC failed, causing a ground-stop that propagated throughout the western United States and lasting as long as 2.5 hours.

All ARTCCs operational under ERAM are running with software that includes the NextGen capabilities of Automatic Dependent Surveillance-Broadcast (ADS-B) and System Wide Information Management (SWIM).
