= List of U.S. Air Route Traffic Control Centers =

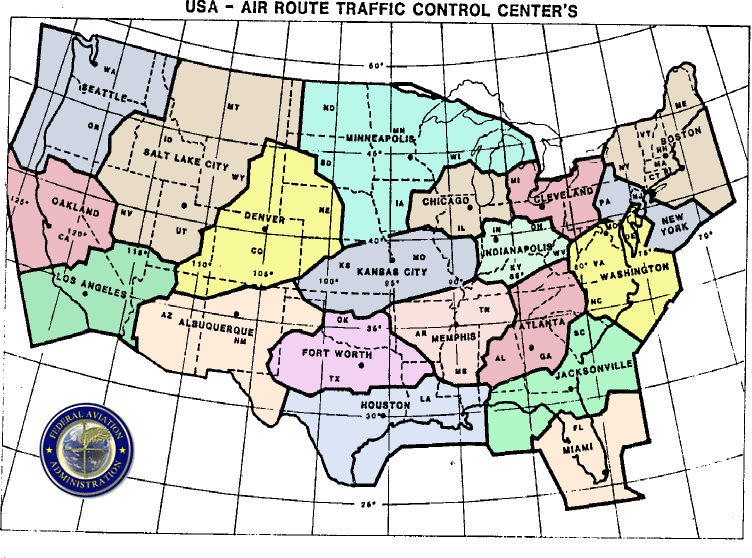
Airspace map of ARTCCs in the US overlaid with what states they cover

The United States has 21 Air Route Traffic Control Centers (ARTCCs): 20 in the contiguous United States and one in Anchorage, Alaska. They are operated by the Federal Aviation Administration (FAA), part of the U.S. Department of Transportation. An ARTCC controls aircraft flying in a specified region of airspace, known as a flight information region (FIR), typically during the en route portion of flight. Federal regulations define air traffic control as a service "to promote the safe, orderly, and expeditious flow of air traffic," and the FAA states that the primary purpose of the air traffic control system is to prevent collisions between aircraft operating in it. In countries other than the U.S., such a facility is generally known as an area control center.

- Albuquerque Air Route Traffic Control Center
- Anchorage Air Route Traffic Control Center
- Atlanta Air Route Traffic Control Center
- Boston Air Route Traffic Control Center
- Chicago Air Route Traffic Control Center
- Cleveland Air Route Traffic Control Center
- Denver Air Route Traffic Control Center
- Fort Worth Air Route Traffic Control Center
- Houston Air Route Traffic Control Center
- Indianapolis Air Route Traffic Control Center
- Jacksonville Air Route Traffic Control Center
- Kansas City Air Route Traffic Control Center
- Los Angeles Air Route Traffic Control Center
- Memphis Air Route Traffic Control Center
- Miami Air Route Traffic Control Center
- Minneapolis Air Route Traffic Control Center
- New York Air Route Traffic Control Center
- Oakland Air Route Traffic Control Center
- Salt Lake City Air Route Traffic Control Center
- Seattle Air Route Traffic Control Center
- Washington Air Route Traffic Control Center

In addition to the 21 ARTCCs, the FAA lists four combined control facilities:

- the Honolulu Control Facility, which includes the Honolulu Center Radar Approach Control (CERAP)
- the San Juan CERAP in Puerto Rico
- the Guam CERAP
- the Joshua Control Facility at Edwards Air Force Base, California, which controls the R-2508 complex of restricted airspace

The FAA counts these four together with the ARTCCs as 25 centers. A CERAP combines the functions of an ARTCC with those of a terminal radar approach control (TRACON) facility.

== Aviation traffic handled in 2025 ==
The table shows the number of aircraft each of the 25 facilities handled in calendar year 2025, as reported by the FAA's Air Traffic Activity System (ATADS). The counts cover flights the facility controls under instrument flight rules (IFR). Each IFR flight that departs within a facility's area is counted twice, and each flight that passes through without landing is counted once. The FAA sorts flights into four categories:

- Air carrier: airline and cargo flights in aircraft that can carry more than 60 passengers.
- Air taxi: other commercial flights in smaller aircraft, such as 50-seat regional jets, small turboprops and charter flights. Despite the name, the category is broader than air taxi services.
- General aviation: all other civilian flights, such as private, business and training flights. See general aviation.
- Military: all military flights. See military aviation.

FAA ID	Name	Location	Air carrier	Air taxi	General aviation	Military	Total
ZAB	Albuquerque Center	Albuquerque, New Mexico	1,249,853	252,284	250,967	72,976	1,826,080
ZAN	Anchorage Center	Anchorage, Alaska	284,047	241,198	50,803	59,568	635,616
ZAU	Chicago Center	Aurora, Illinois	1,685,869	283,891	273,938	13,838	2,257,536
ZBW	Boston Center	Nashua, New Hampshire	1,106,139	255,161	152,680	27,426	1,541,406
ZDC	Washington Center	Leesburg, Virginia	1,842,661	368,009	269,991	73,322	2,553,983
ZDV	Denver Center	Longmont, Colorado	1,437,882	355,633	261,125	25,025	2,079,665
ZFW	Fort Worth Center	Fort Worth, Texas	1,591,087	247,347	416,498	116,514	2,371,446
ZHU	Houston Center	Houston, Texas	1,551,852	288,251	411,843	141,085	2,393,031
ZID	Indianapolis Center	Indianapolis, Indiana	1,612,493	231,255	299,941	23,816	2,167,505
ZJX	Jacksonville Center	Hilliard, Florida	1,747,080	350,257	512,971	96,316	2,706,624
ZKC	Kansas City Center	Olathe, Kansas	1,245,519	217,273	339,129	62,636	1,864,557
ZLA	Los Angeles Center	Palmdale, California	1,757,561	304,415	286,423	55,789	2,404,188
ZLC	Salt Lake City Center	Salt Lake City, Utah	1,130,735	240,299	214,810	24,650	1,610,494
ZMA	Miami Center	Miami, Florida	1,865,967	358,954	442,414	28,486	2,695,821
ZME	Memphis Center	Memphis, Tennessee	1,479,033	241,714	444,596	103,247	2,268,590
ZMP	Minneapolis Center	Farmington, Minnesota	1,199,213	315,430	360,979	33,997	1,909,619
ZNY	New York Center	Ronkonkoma, New York	1,933,767	319,466	244,899	23,872	2,522,004
ZOA	Oakland Center	Fremont, California	1,352,375	168,964	185,069	70,687	1,777,095
ZOB	Cleveland Center	Oberlin, Ohio	1,669,291	293,960	235,977	21,103	2,220,331
ZSE	Seattle Center	Auburn, Washington	893,434	103,638	157,607	51,256	1,205,935
ZTL	Atlanta Center	Hampton, Georgia	2,189,405	410,980	538,515	54,574	3,193,474
HCF	Honolulu Control Facility	Honolulu, Hawaii	364,362	49,319	22,120	21,281	457,082
JCF	Joshua Control Facility	Edwards Air Force Base, California	45,340	26,950	28,137	88,237	188,664
ZSU	San Juan CERAP	Carolina, Puerto Rico	275,192	52,484	35,757	3,693	367,126
ZUA	Guam CERAP	Barrigada, Guam	159,131	1,325	6,664	55,618	222,738
Total			31,669,288	5,978,457	6,443,853	1,349,012	45,440,610

== See also ==
- List of area control centers
