= List of WAAS reference stations =

Each reference station in the Wide Area Augmentation System includes three GPS antennas. The coordinates of each antenna, along with its elevation, are listed below.

City	ICAO	Antenna 1	Antenna 2	Antenna 3
Bethel, Alaska	PABE	60.787916486°N 161.841724416°W, 52.203 m	60.787897064°N 161.841663857°W, 52.204 m	60.787881127°N 161.841728605°W, 52.198 m
Billings, Montana	KBIL	45.803707088°N 108.539722283°W, 1112.261 m	45.803716383°N 108.539780649°W, 1112.266 m	45.803756811°N 108.539680968°W, 1112.255 m
Utqiaġvik, Alaska	PABR	71.282765883°N 156.789923397°W, 15.577 m	71.282798595°N 156.789965306°W, 15.589 m	71.282793925°N 156.789856228°W, 15.577 m
Cold Bay, Alaska	PACD	55.200334771°N 162.718472052°W, 53.648 m	55.200394330°N 162.718489390°W, 53.652 m	55.200400493°N 162.718623936°W, 53.657 m
Fairbanks, Alaska	PAFA	64.809630987°N 147.847339789°W, 149.891 m	64.809681435°N 147.847491409°W, 149.897 m	64.809748030°N 147.847379206°W, 149.876 m
Honolulu, Hawaii	PHNL	21.312988930°N 157.920824884°W, 24.678 m	21.312645960°N 157.920980760°W, 25.022 m	21.312714586°N 157.920825156°W, 25.067 m
Juneau, Alaska	PAJN	58.362575024°N 134.585705943°W, 16.024 m	58.362469451°N 134.585487326°W, 16.029 m	58.362545895°N 134.585292259°W, 16.020 m
Mérida, Yucatán	MMMD	20.931909130°N 089.662840352°W, 29.133 m	20.931901399°N 089.662887739°W, 29.171 m	20.931946482°N 089.662890840°W, 29.168 m
Mexico City	MMMX	19.431653203°N 099.068389471°W, 2236.638 m	19.431676477°N 099.068348099°W, 2236.625 m	19.431629899°N 099.068430820°W, 2236.652 m
Puerto Vallarta, Jalisco	MMPR	20.679003359°N 105.249202871°W, 10.973 m	20.679041461°N 105.249177972°W, 11.269 m	20.679059454°N 105.249221363°W, 10.990 m
San José del Cabo, Baja California Sur	MMSD	23.160445938°N 109.717646195°W, 104.297 m	23.160383141°N 109.717652895°W, 104.285 m	23.160419201°N 109.717704568°W, 104.277 m
Tapachula, Chiapas	MMTP	14.791366074°N 092.367999089°W, 54.962 m	14.791334042°N 092.367965119°W, 54.950 m	14.791319966°N 092.368009440°W, 54.855 m
Kotzebue, Alaska	PAOT	66.887333160°N 162.611372024°W, 10.911 m	66.887368005°N 162.611390215°W, 10.909 m	66.887356742°N 162.611304386°W, 10.913 m
Iqaluit, Nunavut	CYFB	63.731490169°N 068.543181586°W, 10.022 m	63.731464001°N 068.543402553°W, 9.957 m	63.731386362°N 068.543596671°W, 10.014 m
Gander, Newfoundland and Labrador	CYQX	48.966489496°N 054.597631164°W, 146.888 m	48.966447606°N 054.597532034°W, 146.887 m	48.966406383°N 054.597433025°W, 146.899 m
Winnipeg, Manitoba	CYWG	49.900574663°N 097.259396222°W, 222.042 m	49.900677586°N 097.259217224°W, 222.051 m	49.900568446°N 097.259226893°W, 222.045 m
Goose Bay, Newfoundland and Labrador	CYYR	53.308646665°N 060.419467188°W, 37.830 m	53.308713007°N 060.419365697°W, 37.844 m	53.308803193°N 060.419371104°W, 37.853 m
Albuquerque, New Mexico	KZAB	35.173575457°N 106.567349162°W, 1620.117 m	35.173574799°N 106.567287780°W, 1620.181 m	35.173532365°N 106.567287878°W, 1620.164 m
Anchorage, Alaska	PAZA	61.229202467°N 149.780248917°W, 80.660 m	61.229118812°N 149.780422686°W, 80.653 m	61.229202391°N 149.780423003°W, 80.648 m
Aurora, Illinois	KZAU	41.782657876°N 088.331335953°W, 195.918 m	41.782595526°N 088.331334442°W, 195.921 m	41.782596464°N 088.331253756°W, 195.926 m
Nashua, New Hampshire	KZBW	42.735720140°N 071.480425027°W, 39.125 m	42.735724128°N 071.480358015°W, 39.151 m	42.735671312°N 071.480352294°W, 39.147 m
Leesburg, Virginia	KZDC	39.101595603°N 077.542745736°W, 80.084 m	39.101523590°N 077.542730286°W, 80.080 m	39.101548982°N 077.542774296°W, 80.092 m
Longmont, Colorado	KZDV	40.187303318°N 105.127223496°W, 1541.399 m	40.187303552°N 105.127154188°W, 1541.391 m	40.187253096°N 105.127167214°W, 1541.377 m
Fort Worth, Texas	KZFW	32.830649739°N 097.066471191°W, 155.617 m	32.830596303°N 097.066523654°W, 155.576 m	32.830598335°N 097.066470282°W, 155.620 m
Houston, Texas	KZHU	29.961896297°N 095.331425748°W, 10.908 m	29.961831785°N 095.331449752°W, 10.974 m	29.961773563°N 095.331512004°W, 10.958 m
Hilliard, Florida	KZJX	30.698859379°N 081.908184568°W, 2.149 m	30.698823791°N 081.908152480°W, 2.140 m	30.698791217°N 081.908198025°W, 2.135 m
Olathe, Kansas	KZKC	38.880159315°N 094.790833106°W, 305.904 m	38.880160009°N 094.790643592°W, 305.903 m	38.880101810°N 094.790710614°W, 305.636 m
Palmdale, California	KZLA	34.603517830°N 118.083893947°W, 763.521 m	34.603517881°N 118.083828796°W, 763.520 m	34.603473855°N 118.083893956°W, 763.598 m
Salt Lake City, Utah	KZLC	40.786043564°N 111.952176782°W, 1287.421 m	40.785990178°N 111.952176149°W, 1287.416 m	40.785990067°N 111.952122320°W, 1287.423 m
Miami, Florida	KZMA	25.824611968°N 080.319189364°W, -7.579 m	25.824659706°N 080.319315758°W, -8.207 m	25.824661752°N 080.319234381°W, -7.861 m
Memphis, Tennessee	KZME	35.067394005°N 089.955369299°W, 68.609 m	35.067437537°N 089.955368937°W, 68.883 m	35.067439374°N 089.955436864°W, 68.871 m
Farmington, Minnesota	KZMP	44.637463181°N 093.152084552°W, 262.679 m	44.637463059°N 093.152011267°W, 262.693 m	44.637407004°N 093.152022108°W, 262.628 m
Ronkonkoma, New York	KZNY	40.784328238°N 073.097164869°W, 6.457 m	40.784275495°N 073.097154931°W, 5.930 m	40.784275925°N 073.097223653°W, 5.936 m
Fremont, California	KZOA	37.543053122°N 122.015945899°W, -3.497 m	37.543025498°N 122.015892540°W, -3.481 m	37.542981164°N 122.015929270°W, -3.400 m
Oberlin, Ohio	KZOB	41.297154278°N 082.206443927°W, 223.689 m	41.297166589°N 082.206351733°W, 225.187 m	41.297086827°N 082.206379312°W, 223.468 m
Auburn, Washington	KZSE	47.286993478°N 122.188372098°W, 82.112 m	47.286907917°N 122.188382169°W, 82.168 m	47.286856213°N 122.188363949°W, 82.105 m
San Juan, Puerto Rico	TJZS	18.431335686°N 065.993476761°W, -28.062 m	18.431218583°N 065.993514086°W, -28.047 m	18.431198889°N 065.993448100°W, -28.108 m
Hampton, Georgia	KZTL	33.379688402°N 084.296725378°W, 261.138 m	33.379691546°N 084.296656313°W, 261.126 m	33.379634831°N 084.296652682°W, 261.161 m
