= Rock Center of Little Gellért Hill =

Rock Center / Citadel / Deep 23 / National Counter-Air Center
- Sziklaközpont / Fellegvár / Mély 23 / Országos Légvédelmi Központ (OLK, ORLÉKÖZ)
- Schweidel Street, 11th district, Budapest, Hungary

Site information
- Type: military bunker, supply depot, counter-air command center, air traffic control center
- Owner: Royal Hungarian Army (pre-1945?), National Anti-Air and Air Force Command (OLLP) (post-1945?), various military intelligence agencies under the Ministry of Interior (BM) (pre-1990), Military Security Office (KBH) (1990–2011), Military National Security Service (KNBSZ) (2012–present)
- Controlled by: Hungary
- Open to the public: no
- Condition: partly abandoned

Location
- Coordinates: 47.486064°N 19.028457°E

Site history
- Built: 1930s–1940s?
- In use: 1948–1957 (as the ORLÉKÖZ counter-air command center); 1965–1999 (as air traffic control center)
- Materials: reinforced concrete

The Rock Center or just the Rock (Hungarian: Sziklaközpont or Szikla [ˈsiklɒkøspont]), more precisely the Rock Center of Little Gellért Hill, originally known as the Citadel (Fellegvár), is a mostly subterranean military complex in the 11th district (Újbuda) of Budapest, Hungary. It is under Little Gellért Hill, the Western extremity of the well-known Gellért Hill. It is also known by the codename Deep 23 (Mély 23). The complex hosted the National Counter-Air Center and thus it is also known by that name. The Rock Center should not be confused with the nearby Citadella, which was never called Fellegvár (the Hungarian translation of the Italian word citadella), but which also has a military bunker, the Gellért Hill bunker under it.

As of 2017, the premises are under the authority of Hungary's military intelligence agency, the Military National Security Service (Katonai Nemzetbiztonsági Szolgálat; KNBSZ). Although the complex was declassified, it is not open to the general public or members of the press.

== History ==
The construction of the actual bunker complex of the Rock Center was started in the interwar period and it was finished during World War II. It was used as a military depot during the war out of necessity. The complex was closed off during the siege of Budapest.

After the war, the Rock Center was chosen as the host facility for the National Counter-Air Center (Országos Légvédelmi Központ; OLK, ORLÉKÖZ), which was established on October 1, 1948. Technical installation in the complex was finished in September 1949. The Rock Center served as the host until 1957. The complex was the central command hub not just for the air-based counter-air defense (by the Homeland Air Force of the Hungarian People's Army), but also for ground-based anti-aircraft artillery and air raid defense activity.

From 1965 to the end of 1999, the Rock Center hosted Hungary's air traffic Area Control Center (ACC) in accordance to an agreement between the Hungarian People's Army, the government and the state-owned airline MALÉV. The ACC used paper-based procedural control up until 1981, when radar control was officially introduced. At times the controllers also had to resort to establish VFR which required maintaining self-separation.

From 1965 to 1970, the air traffic controllers worked in the bunker system itself, then in 1970, they were relocated to an over-the-ground multi-story building connected to the bunker, the so-called RISZ building. In early 1975 they were relocated back to the Rock Center proper. In late 1980 Utyos-M primary and Koren-A secondary radar systems were installed on the roof and fourth floor of the RISZ, and in January 1981 the controllers were assigned to the third floor. They worked there until the ACC was assigned to the HungaroCon facilities at Budapest Ferihegy International Airport (ANS I, later ANS III) in January 2000.

For some time, the complex also hosted the fax center of Magyar Telekom (MATÁV).

Until recently, the complex was classified as top secret. Some collapsed or unstable parts of it were abandoned as early as 1944 during the Allied bombings of the world war, later some areas were sealed off during reconstructions, therefore the original extent of the complex (which was built in a former underground quarry) is unknown.

== Structure ==
The Rock Center is under the 168 m (551 ft) high Little Gellért Hill (Kis Gellért-hegy), the Western extremity of the well-known Gellért Hill.

The complex consists of a multi-level underground bunker system (the Rock Center proper), and at least one building on the surface, a four-story building known as RISZ. The main entrance is at Schweidel Street.

=== The underground bunker system ===
The multi-level bunker system occupies parts of a former underground quarry which is surrounded by dolomite. It has at least two levels and the entrance is sealed with a roughly 30 cm (12 in) thick, hinged blast door.

There are rumors about the bunker system being connected to the nearby Gellért Hill and Eagle Hill bunkers.

=== The RISZ building ===
The RISZ building was originally three story high, later a fourth floor was built onto it by MALÉV. RISZ is an acronym, using the Hungarian letters R, I and Sz, but the meaning is not publicly known.

== See also ==
- F-4 Object
- Gellért Hill
- Air traffic control
