= Indianapolis Air Route Traffic Control Center =

Area air traffic control center in the US

Coordinates: 39°44′17.5″N 86°16′48.8″W

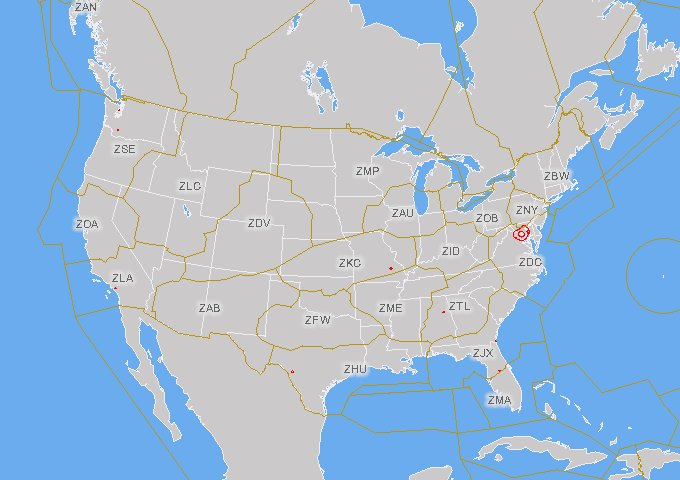
Temporary flight restriction map showing boundaries of ARTCC regions, with FAA location identifiers

Indianapolis Air Route Traffic Control Center (ZID), (radio communications, "Indy Center") is one of 22 established FAA area control centers, and is located at 1850 South Sigsbee Street, Indianapolis, Indiana, United States.

The primary responsibility of Indianapolis Center is sequencing and separation of over-flights, arrivals, and departures in order to provide safe, orderly, and expeditious flow of aircraft filed under instrument flight rules (IFR).

Indianapolis Center is the 12th busiest ARTCC in the United States. In 2024, Indianapolis Center handled 2,097,778 aircraft operations. Indianapolis Center covers approximately 73,000 square miles of the Midwestern United States in most of Indiana, Kentucky, Ohio, and West Virginia, and small portions of Illinois, Tennessee, and Virginia. Indianapolis Center lies adjacent to six Air Route Traffic Control Centers: Washington Air Route Traffic Control Center, Atlanta Air Route Traffic Control Center, Memphis Air Route Traffic Control Center, Kansas City Air Route Traffic Control Center, Cleveland Air Route Traffic Control Center, and Chicago Air Route Traffic Control Center. ZID overlies or abuts many approach control facilities (including Indianapolis, Louisville, Cincinnati, Huntington, Terre Haute, Columbus, and Charleston).

On September 11, 2001, Indianapolis Center was handling American Airlines Flight 77. Indianapolis Center was the first enroute facility to use CPDLC (Controller - Pilot Data Link Communication). ZID along with UPS tested the system during nightly operations in 2018.

== Popular culture ==
Indianapolis Center is depicted in the second scene of Steven Spielberg's Close Encounters of the Third Kind (1977), in which an air traffic controller provides information and guidance to pilots of two passenger jets (Trans World Airlines, Allegheny Airlines and a fictional "Air East") who are en route through the ZID flight information region to avoid collisions with each other or with an unidentified "aircraft" that appears to have extremely bright anti-collision lights and is "exhibiting some non-ballistic motion." A supervisor orders another controller to "get on the horn with the 45th Recon Wing to find out if there is a test flight mission in "Restricted Area 2508." (The actual 45th Tactical Reconnaissance Squadron was based at Bergstrom Air Force Base in the mid-1970s, but was inactivated not long before the film's pre-production. The real Restricted Area 2508 is located in Southern California.) The scene concluded with a senior supervisor instructing the controller to ask the TWA and Air East pilots if they wish to officially report a UFO. Both pilots declined.
