= Zdv =

Zdv or ZDV may refer to:

- ZDV, an air traffic control center in the United States
- Zentral-Dombauverein zu Köln von 1842, a civic association of Germany
- Zero-day vulnerability
- Zidovudine, an antiretroviral drug
