= Chicago Air Route Traffic Control Center =

Air Route Traffic Control Center in Aurora, Illinois, US

Coordinates: 41°46′58″N 88°19′52″W

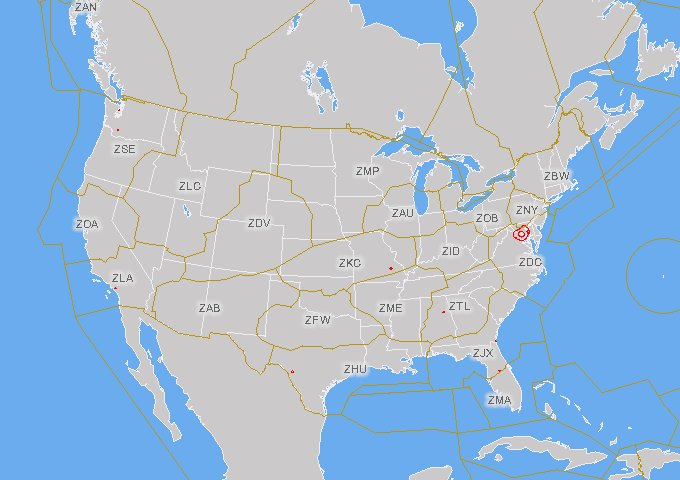
Temporary flight restriction map showing boundaries of ARTCC regions, with FAA location identifiers

Chicago Air Route Traffic Control Center (ZAU) (radio communications: "Chicago Center") is one of 22 Air Route Traffic Control Centers (ARTCCs) operated by the United States Federal Aviation Administration. It is located at 619 W. New Indian Trail Rd., Aurora, Illinois.

The primary responsibility of Chicago Center is sequencing and separation of over-flights, arrivals, and departures in order to provide safe, orderly, and expeditious flow of aircraft.

Chicago Center covers approximately 91,000 square miles (240,000 km^{2}) of the Midwestern United States, including northern Illinois (especially the Chicago metropolitan area), northern Indiana, eastern Iowa, southwest Michigan, and southern Wisconsin.

Chicago Center lies adjacent to Minneapolis Air Route Traffic Control Center, Kansas City Air Route Traffic Control Center, Indianapolis Air Route Traffic Control Center, and Cleveland Air Route Traffic Control Center. ZAU overlies or abuts many approach control facilities (including Chicago, Milwaukee, Madison, Cedar Rapids, Des Moines, the Quad Cities, Peoria, Springfield, Indianapolis, and Grand Rapids approaches).

Chicago Center is the tenth busiest ARTCC in the United States. In 2024, Chicago Center handled 2,141,995 aircraft operations.

== 2014 fire ==
On September 26, 2014, an arson at the Chicago Center (ZAU) facility caused operations across ZAU-controlled airspace to be suspended, including airport operations at Chicago's O'Hare and Midway International Airports, resulting in canceled flights. One employee at the facility was treated for smoke inhalation, while remaining employees were evacuated.

Brian Howard, who had been working for the FAA as a contract employee of Harris Corporation, was charged with one count of "destruction of aircraft or aircraft facilities" following the incident.
