= ZOB =

ZOB can refer to:

- Jewish Combat Organization
- Cleveland Air Route Traffic Control Center
- Berlin Zoologischer Garten railway station
- Zentraler Omnibus Bahnhof, a common German abbreviation for a town's main bus station.

== See also ==
- Zhob, a town and district in Pakistan
