= Kansas City Air Route Traffic Control Center =

Coordinates: 38.8803°N 94.7908°W

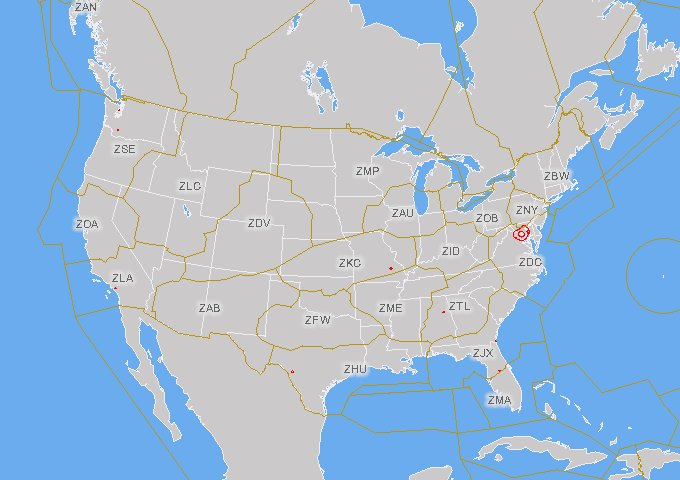
A temporary flight restriction map showing the boundaries of the regions controlled by the area control centers within and adjoining the contiguous United States; Kansas City Center is labeled ZKC, its FAA location identifier.

Kansas City Air Route Traffic Control Center (ZKC) (radio communications, "Kansas City Center"), is one of 22 Federal Aviation Administration (FAA) Area Control Centers. It is located at 250 S. Rogers Rd. Olathe, Kansas, United States.

The primary responsibility of Kansas City Center is sequencing and separation of over-flights, arrivals, and departures in order to provide safe, orderly, and expeditious flow of aircraft filed under instrument flight rules (IFR).

Kansas City Center is the 15th busiest ARTCC in the United States. In 2024, Kansas City Center handled 1,839,511 aircraft operations. Kansas City Center covers approximately 192,000 square miles of the Midwestern United States, Southern United States, and the Western United States, including most parts of Kansas and Missouri (especially Kansas City metropolitan area and Greater St. Louis), northern Oklahoma, southwest Illinois, and small portions of Arkansas, Colorado, Iowa, Nebraska, and Texas.

Kansas City Center lies adjacent to seven Air Route Traffic Control Centers, including Minneapolis Air Route Traffic Control Center, Chicago Air Route Traffic Control Center, Indianapolis Air Route Traffic Control Center, Memphis Air Route Traffic Control Center, Fort Worth Air Route Traffic Control Center, Denver Air Route Traffic Control Center, and Albuquerque Air Route Traffic Control Center. ZKC overlies or abuts many approach control facilities (including Kansas City, Oklahoma City, St. Louis, Tulsa, Springfield, MO, and Wichita).
