= National Track Analysis Program =

All Air Route Traffic Control Centers (ARTCC) have the capability to recall recorded radar data. The National Track Analysis Program (NTAP) can identify and track targets which are at a sufficient altitude to be tracked by radar whether or not they are being "controlled" by the ARTCC. NTAPs requested by the AFRCC have proven to be very helpful during an aircraft search by providing the route of flight and last radar position of an aircraft being searched for.
