= Atlanta Air Route Traffic Control Center =

Coordinates: 33°22′52″N 84°17′48″W

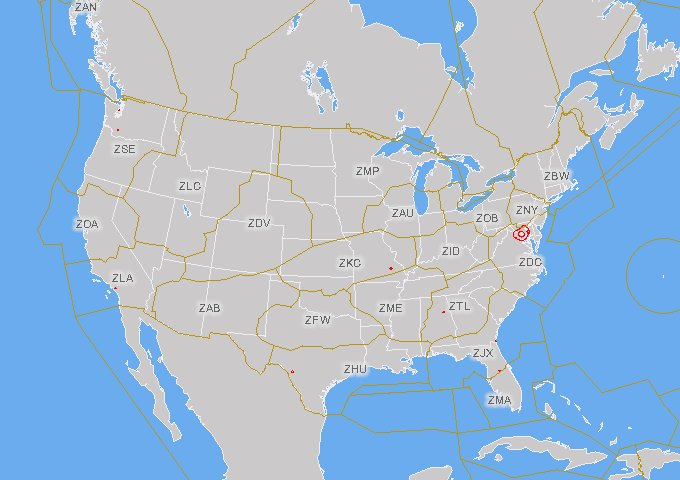
A temporary flight restriction map showing the boundaries of the regions controlled by the area control centers within and adjoining the contiguous United States; Atlanta Center is labeled ZTL, its FAA location identifier.

Atlanta Air Route Traffic Control Center (ZTL) (radio communications, "Atlanta Center") is one of 22 Air Route Traffic Control Centers operated by the United States Federal Aviation Administration. It is located at 299 Woolsey Rd, Hampton, Georgia, United States.

The primary responsibility of Atlanta Center is sequencing and separation of over-flights, arrivals, and departures in order to provide safe, orderly, and expeditious flow of aircraft.

Atlanta Center is the busiest air traffic control facility in the United States. In 2024, Atlanta Center handled 3,104,115 aircraft operations. Atlanta Center covers approximately 129,000 square miles of the Southern United States, including most parts of Alabama and Georgia (especially Greater Atlanta), eastern Tennessee, western parts of North Carolina and South Carolina, southwest Virginia, and a small portion of Kentucky. It also touches parts of Florida and Mississippi.

Atlanta Center borders five other Air Route Traffic Control Centers, including Houston Air Route Traffic Control Center, Jacksonville Air Route Traffic Control Center, Washington Air Route Traffic Control Center, Indianapolis Air Route Traffic Control Center, and Memphis Air Route Traffic Control Center. ZTL overlies or abuts many approach control facilities (including Atlanta, Charlotte, Greensboro, Knoxville, Chattanooga, and Birmingham, Alabama approaches).
