= Radar control =

Type of air traffic control

Radar control is a method of providing air traffic control services with the use of radar and Automatic Dependent Surveillance (ADS–B). The provision of air traffic control services without the use of radar is called procedural control.

== Separation ==
In air traffic control, the risk of aircraft colliding is managed by applying separation rules. These rules require aircraft to be separated by either a minimum vertical distance (usually 1,000-2,000 feet) or by a minimum horizontal distance. One of the means of determining horizontal separation is by a controller observing the radar returns of the aircraft to be at least a minimum horizontal distance apart. This is the essence of radar control, and is known as radar separation. Standard radar separation varies from airspace to airspace and country to country, however 3 nms in terminal airspace and 5 nms in en route airspace are common minima.

== Maintaining separation ==
In airspace with a lower amount of traffic, controllers will require pilots to navigate their aircraft on published routes which have been designed to be separated from each other. Controllers may require pilots to fly their aircraft at certain speeds or with certain minimum or maximum speeds to maintain separation between aircraft on these routes.

When the amount of traffic in a particular volume of airspace reaches a certain level, it becomes impossible to keep aircraft following set routes separated, particularly in airspace where aircraft are climbing and descending (and therefore level separation regularly cannot be maintained). In this case controllers use "radar vectors", the issuing of headings to the pilots of aircraft on which the controller expects the pilots to fly their aircraft, to tactically keep aircraft separated in the sky. Much skill is involved in this type of control: it is this type of controlling that has led air traffic control to be described as "3D chess".
