= Denver Air Route Traffic Control Center =

Coordinates: 40.1873°N 105.1270°W

Denver Air Route Traffic Control Center (ZDV) (radio communications, Denver Center) is one of 22 American area control centers. It is located at 2211 17th Ave, Longmont, Colorado.

The primary responsibility of Denver Center is sequencing and separation of over-flights, arrivals, and departures to provide safe, orderly, and expeditious flow of aircraft filed under instrument flight rules (IFR).

Denver Center is the 13th busiest ARTCC in the United States. In 2024, Denver Center handled 2,022,029 aircraft. Denver Center covers approximately 285,000 square miles of the Western United States, including much of Colorado, northeast Kansas, western Nebraska, southwest South Dakota, southeast Utah, eastern Wyoming, and small portions of Arizona, Montana, and New Mexico.

Denver Center is adjacent to five other Air Route Traffic Control Centers: Minneapolis Air Route Traffic Control Center, Kansas City Air Route Traffic Control Center, Albuquerque Air Route Traffic Control Center, Los Angeles Air Route Traffic Control Center, and Salt Lake City Air Route Traffic Control Center. The Denver Center overlies or abuts several approach control facilities (including Denver, Aspen, Colorado Springs, Pueblo, Grand Junction, Casper, Cheyenne, and Ellsworth AFB in Rapid City).
