= Procedural control =

Providing air traffic control without radar

Procedural control (also known as non-radar control) is a method of providing air traffic control services without the use of radar. It is used in regions of the world, specifically sparsely populated land areas and oceans, where radar coverage is either prohibitively expensive or is simply not feasible. It also may be used at very low-traffic airports, or at other airports at night when the traffic levels may not justify staffing the radar control positions, or as a back-up system in the case of radar failure.

== Separation ==
In air traffic control, the risk of aircraft colliding is managed by applying separation rules. These rules require aircraft to be separated by either a minimum vertical distance, or if vertical separation is not feasible, by a minimum horizontal distance defined by various means. One of the means of determining horizontal separation is by a controller observing the radar returns of the aircraft to be at least a minimum horizontal distance apart. This is the essence of radar control and is probably the form of air traffic control most familiar to lay people.

However, in times gone by radar was not very common, and in certain parts of the world today it still is not common, on grounds of cost or technical feasibility. Procedural control is a form of air traffic control that can be provided to aircraft in regions without radar, by providing horizontal separation based upon time, the geography of predetermined routes, or aircraft position reports based upon ground-based navigation aids, for those aircraft that are not vertically separated.

== Techniques ==
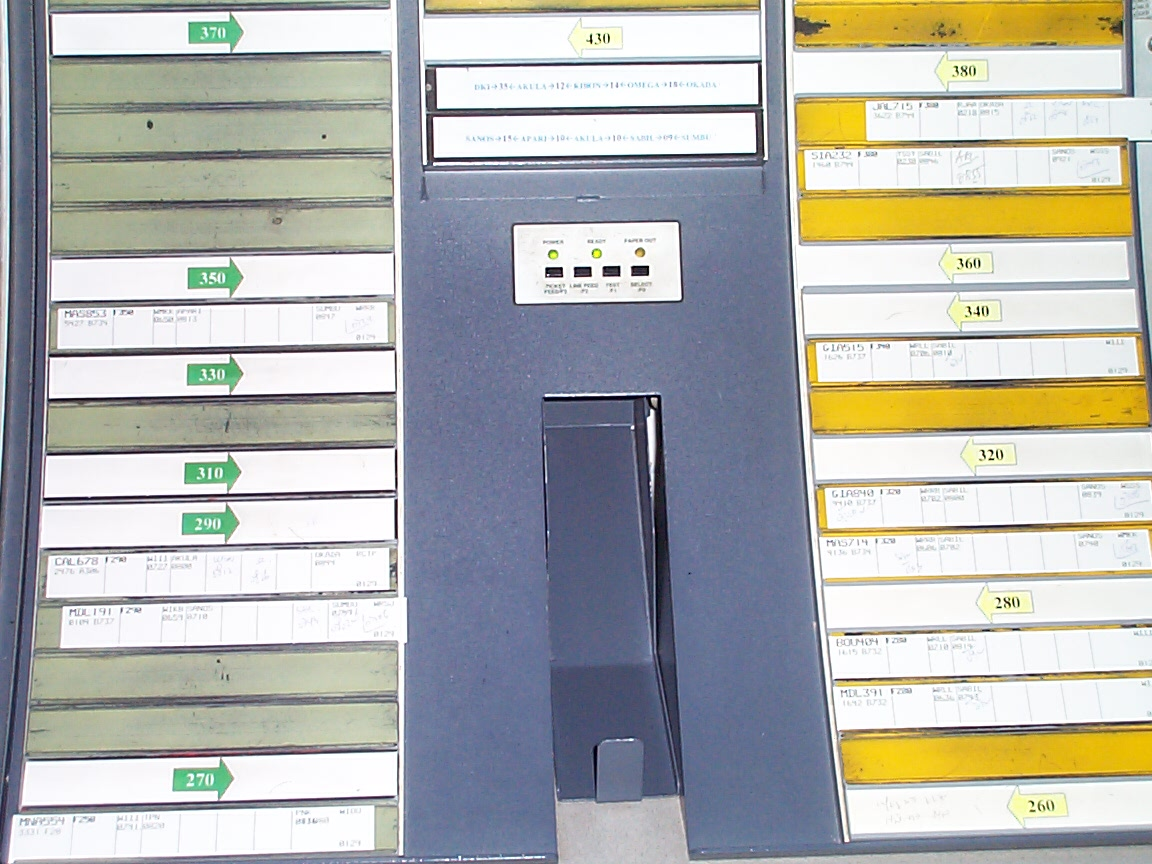
A strip rack at a high-altitude procedural sector in Indonesia

The central rule of procedural control is that each aircraft is cleared onto a predetermined route (airway), and no aircraft traveling on the same or intersecting routes at the same level shall come within 10 minutes' flying time of another (or sometimes 15 minutes depending on the accuracy of the available radio navigation beacons).

Using procedural control, the controller must maintain a mental picture of the location of aircraft based on each aircraft's flight progress strip, which contains its route, altitude and estimated times over reporting points. That information is compared against all other aircraft in the sector to determine if there are any conflicts. For aircraft that conflict, the controller issues an altitude, speed or routing change that both separates the conflicting aircraft from each other, while still remaining separated from all others. After all conflicts have been resolved in this way, the sector is considered "separated" and the controller only needs to check again for conflicts when new aircraft are added, or if an aircraft needs to change its altitude, or if the aircraft reaches a reporting point significantly earlier or later than previously estimated.

There are two main techniques controllers use to organize flight progress strips in order to best detect conflicts: grouped together by altitude, or grouped together by route intersection points (fix posting area). Altitude grouping is the easiest and most common method when most aircraft in the sector tend to be level at a cruising altitude, such as in trans-oceanic sectors. Each aircraft's strip is placed in a "bay" (labeled section of the strip rack) depending on its altitude. Because aircraft cruising at different altitudes will never conflict regardless of route of flight or estimated times, they don't need to be checked against each other. Only aircraft at the same altitude (i.e. in the same bay) need to be further evaluated. If an aircraft needs to transition to a new altitude (whether changing cruising level, or descending to or climbing from an airport), it only needs to be checked against others in the bays between the current altitude and destination altitude.

The fix posting area method is easier however when there are a lot of altitude changes because of numerous departures and arrivals within the sector. This is a more obscure method today because most airports around the world with significant enough traffic to warrant this technique have at least a radar covering the climb out and arrival area, and only need procedural control for points between (in which case altitude grouping is likely more efficient).

Nevertheless, the fix posting area method was the main technique used in U.S. en route system prior to the 1960s, for example, when en route radar became more widespread. This method evolved from similar techniques used in railroad dispatch. It simplifies conflict detection because aircraft on different routes can only possibly conflict at intersection points with other routes, or with aircraft on the same route. Each intersection point ("fix posting area") in the sector is made into a separate bay on the strip rack, and multiple strips are printed for each aircraft, one per bay. The controller then sorts strips within each bay by the estimated time the aircraft is expected over that point. Only aircraft estimated to cross within 10 minutes of each other are considered possible conflicts, at which point altitudes are then compared to determine if there actually is a conflict. Aircraft on the same route however (in either direction) must be checked for conflict regardless of time over the intersection.

As new altitudes are issued, all of the strips for that aircraft must be annotated with the new data and separation checked again at all of the intersections it passes through. This is more laborious than the altitude method of grouping where only one strip is needed, but possible conflicts between multiple aircraft climbing and descending are easier to discern or discard this way since all intersection points and times are pre-calculated and laid out separately. With the altitude grouping method, if two aircraft are determined to conflict based on altitude, the controller must then manually determine the intersection points and times to further determine or rule out the conflict.

== Procedural approaches ==
The approach plate for an ILS approach shows the pilot the tracks (as defined by navaids) and levels to be flown during the approach.

Every runway used by IFR aircraft normally has a procedural approach defined and published. This generally involves the aircraft flying over a fix (navaid or 'beacon') on or close to the airport (where the aircraft can hold if necessary), flying away from the airport on a set track while descending (going 'beacon outbound'), then at some point (perhaps ten miles) from the airport turning back towards the airport aligned with the runway to make an approach (becoming 'inbound track established' or just 'established').

In procedural approach control, separation is maintained by allowing only one aircraft to be making an approach at any one time; the proceeding aircraft must either be in visual contact by the airport's control tower, or have reported that it has landed before the next aircraft is allowed to leave the hold and commence the approach.

At airports equipped with radar, procedural approaches normally are used only in the event of an aircraft suffering a radio failure, or for training purposes. At non-radar airports or when radar is not available, these are the only means of IFR flights making approaches to the airport.

At some non-radar airports, the procedural approach may be combined with aerodrome control, thus providing a control service for all aircraft at the airport, and all inbound and outbound flights within its terminal airspace. Because most aircraft fly to/or from the same place (i.e. an airport runway) within this airspace, procedural controllers use a variety of separation standards to achieve a safe and expeditious flow of air traffic to and/or from the airport.

One commonly used separation in these locations is track separation, which states that two aircraft on different tracks to/from a navigational aid must be separated from each other provided at least one is a minimum distance from the navaid. The distance required varies dependent upon how far apart the tracks are. For example, two aircraft on tracks that are 60° apart do not have to be far from the navaid to be clear of each other in comparison to two aircraft whose tracks are 13° apart.

== Airspace capacity ==
En-route jet aircraft tend to fly at roughly 8NM per minute: therefore 10–15 minutes' flying time separation using procedural control equates to around 80 to 120 NM (150 to 220 km; 92 to 138 mi) distance between aircraft at the same altitude. Standard separation on radar while en route is only 5NM. Likewise, a typical procedural approach might allow one aircraft to land every 5–10 minutes, whereas with radar can allow one landing every 90 seconds. The provision of radar-based air traffic control gives a large increase in airspace capacity.
