= Fort Worth Air Route Traffic Control Center =

Air traffic control center in Texas, US

Coordinates: 32.8305°N 97.0667°W

The Fort Worth Air Route Traffic Control Center (ZFW) (radio communications: Fort Worth Center) is located at 13800 FAA Road, Fort Worth, Texas, United States 76155. The Fort Worth ARTCC is one of 22 Air Route Traffic Control Centers in the United States. Fort Worth Center handles aircraft movements across more than 174,000 square miles and covers around northern Texas, southern Oklahoma, and small portions of Arkansas, Louisiana, and New Mexico. Fort Worth Center is the seventh busiest ARTCC in the United States. In 2024, Fort Worth Center handled 2,341,168 aircraft.

Dallas/Fort Worth International Airport is north of the control center.

== Airports served by the Fort Worth ARTCC ==
=== Commercial airports ===
- Arkansas
  - Texarkana Regional Airport (Texarkana)
- Louisiana
  - Monroe Regional Airport (Monroe)
  - Shreveport Regional Airport (Shreveport)
- Oklahoma
  - Lawton-Fort Sill Regional Airport (Lawton)
  - Will Rogers World Airport (Oklahoma City)
- Texas
  - Dallas/Fort Worth International Airport (Euless/Grapevine/Irving, near Dallas and Fort Worth)
  - Dallas Love Field (Dallas)
  - Killeen Regional Airport (Bell County, near Killeen)
  - East Texas Regional Airport (Gregg County, near Longview)
  - Lubbock Preston Smith International Airport (Lubbock)
  - Midland International Airport (Midland)
  - San Angelo Regional Airport (San Angelo)
  - Tyler Pounds Regional Airport (Smith County, near Tyler)
  - Waco Regional Airport (Waco)
  - Wichita Falls Municipal Airport (Wichita Falls)
