= Houston Air Route Traffic Control Center =

Coordinates: 29.9615°N 95.3319°W

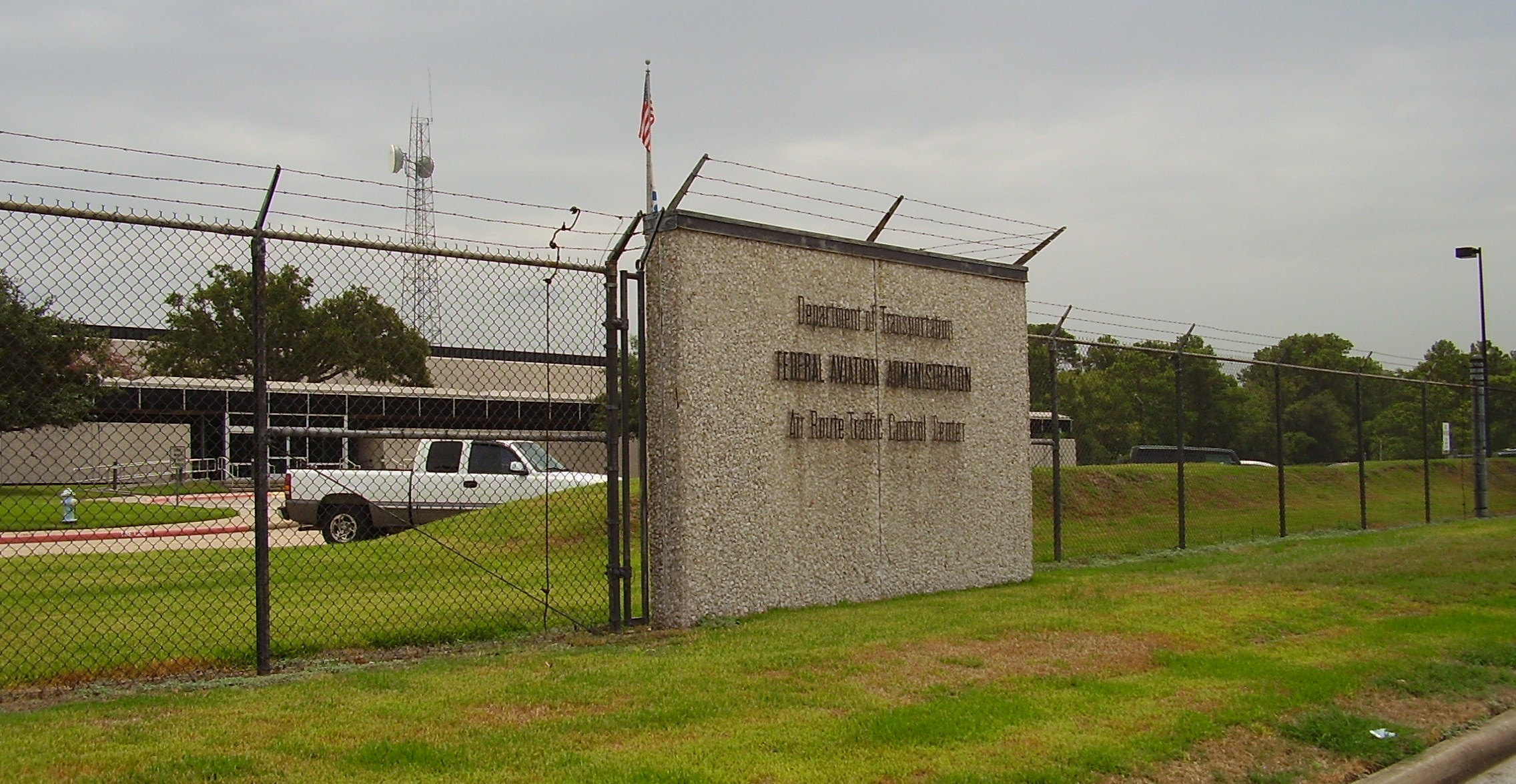
Houston Air Route Traffic Control Center

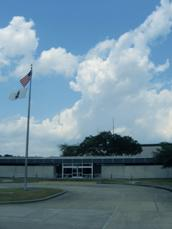
Houston Air Route Traffic Control Center

Houston Air Route Traffic Control Center (ZHU) (radio communications: Houston Center) is located at George Bush Intercontinental Airport at 16600 JFK Boulevard, Houston, Texas, United States 77032. The Houston ARTCC is one of 22 Air Route Traffic Control Centers in the United States. Houston Center is the 8th busiest ARTCC in the United States. In 2024, Houston Center handled 2,338,712 aircraft.

The center controls airspace in southern Texas (including Greater Houston), much of Louisiana, southern Mississippi, southwestern Alabama, and areas in the Gulf of Mexico.

== Airports served by the Houston ARTCC ==
=== Commercial airports ===
- Alabama
  - Mobile Regional Airport (Mobile)
- Louisiana
  - Alexandria International Airport (Rapides Parish, near Alexandria)
  - Baton Rouge Metropolitan Airport (Baton Rouge)
  - Lafayette Regional Airport (Lafayette)
  - Lake Charles Regional Airport (Calcasieu Parish, near Lake Charles)
  - Louis Armstrong New Orleans International Airport (Kenner, near New Orleans)
- Mississippi
  - Gulfport-Biloxi International Airport (Gulfport)
- Texas
  - Austin-Bergstrom International Airport (Austin)
  - Southeast Texas Regional Airport (Port Arthur, near Beaumont)
  - Brownsville/South Padre Island International Airport (Brownsville)
  - Easterwood Field (College Station)
  - Corpus Christi International Airport (Corpus Christi)
  - Del Rio International Airport (Del Rio)
  - Valley International Airport (Harlingen)
  - George Bush Intercontinental Airport (Houston)
  - William P. Hobby Airport (Houston)
  - Laredo International Airport (Laredo)
  - McAllen-Miller International Airport (McAllen)
  - San Antonio International Airport (San Antonio)
  - Scholes International Airport (Galveston)
  - Victoria Regional Airport (Victoria)
