= Cleveland Air Route Traffic Control Center =

Air traffic control center in Ohio, United States

Coordinates: 41°17′50″N 82°12′23″W

Cleveland Air Route Traffic Control Center (ZOB) (radio communications, "Cleveland Center") is located at 326 East Lorain Street, Oberlin, Ohio, United States. The center is located about 30 miles (48 km) outside of the city of Cleveland. The Cleveland ARTCC is the 11th busiest of the 22 Air Route Traffic Control Centers in the United States. In 2024, Cleveland Center handled 2,104,758 aircraft. It oversees the airspace over eastern Michigan (including Detroit metropolitan area), western New York state, northern Ohio, western Pennsylvania, small parts of Maryland and West Virginia, as well as the southernmost portion of Ontario, Canada.

The Air Route Traffic Control Center was first planned in 1958. The site was chosen due to Oberlin's location near Cleveland, though far enough away from the metropolis to be safe in case of war. The nearby community of Medina, Ohio was also under consideration, but lobbying by the Oberlin city government brought the center to its present location.

During the September 11 attacks, the Cleveland ARTCC handled the radio traffic from United Airlines Flight 93, which was inside the center's airspace from before the hijacking to the time of its crash.
