= Washington Air Route Traffic Control Center =

FAA Area Control Center in the Eastern United States

Coordinates: 39.1016°N 77.5429°W

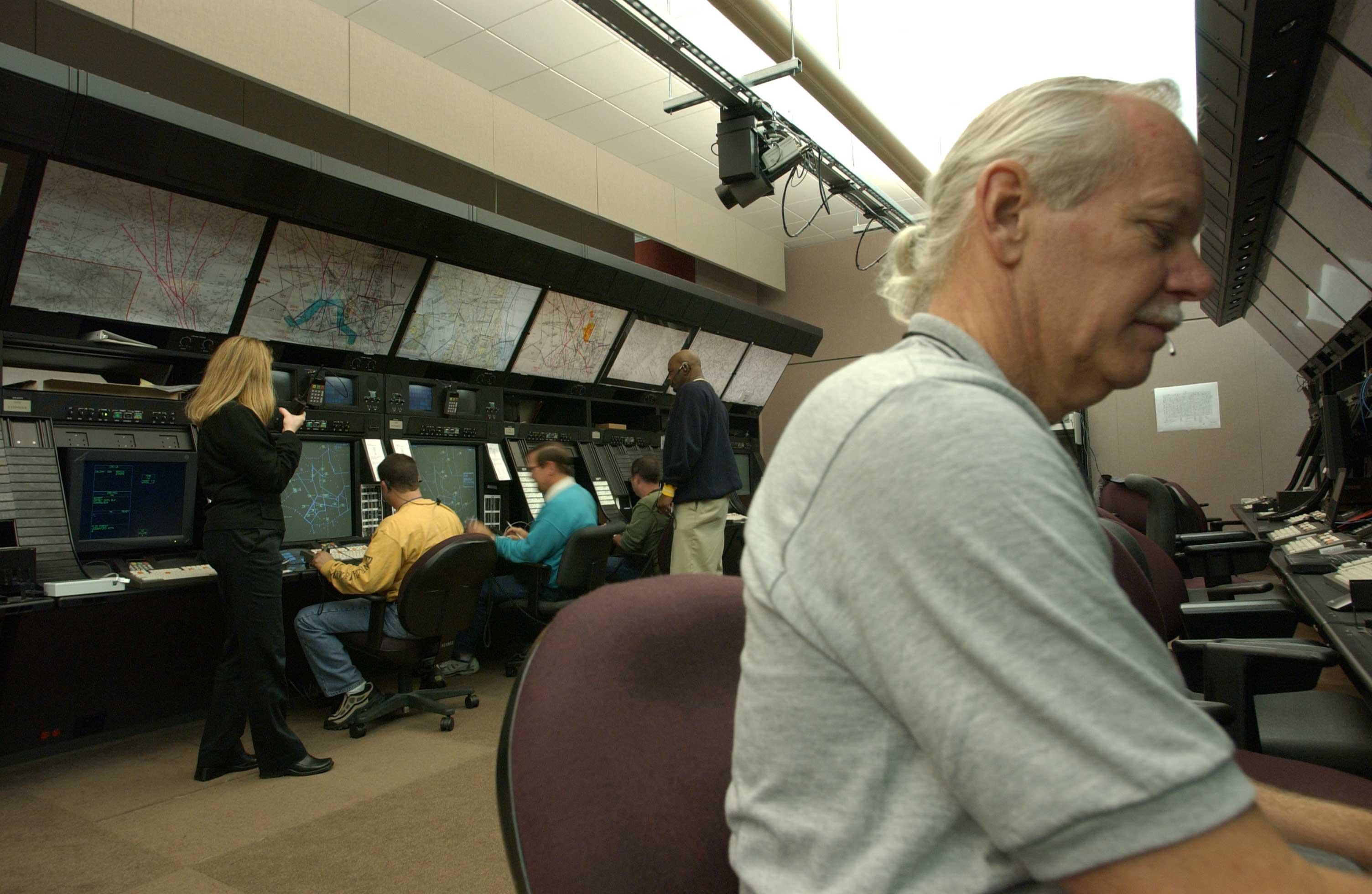
Controllers at work at the Washington Air Route Traffic Control Center.

Washington Air Route Traffic Control Center (ZDC) (radio communications, "Washington Center") is an area control center (ARTCC) operated by the Federal Aviation Administration and located at Lawson Rd SE, Leesburg, Virginia, United States. The primary responsibility of ZDC is the separation of airplane flights and the expedited sequencing of arrivals and departures along STARs (Standard Terminal Arrival Routes) and SIDs (Standard Instrument Departures) for the Washington-Baltimore Metropolitan Area, Philadelphia, and part of the New York Metropolitan Area, among many other areas.

Washington Center is the fourth busiest ARTCC in the United States. In 2024, Washington Center handled 2,468,399 aircraft operations. The Washington ARTCC covers 165,000 square miles (430,000 km^{2}) of airspace that includes airports in Maryland, Pennsylvania, West Virginia, Delaware, New Jersey, Virginia, and North Carolina.

== Basic breakdown of sectors ==
ZDC is divided into 8 areas, numbered 1 through 8, that make up 46 sectors. They are mainly broken down into low altitude, intermediate, high altitude and Super High Altitude sectors. There are 18 low sectors, 14 high sectors, 5 super high sectors and 4 various other type sectors, including 1 high/low altitude sector and 3 intermediate altitude sectors.

=== AREA 1 ===
==== Super-high sectors ====
- 72 Shenandoah SHD 127.925 MHz/269.375 MHz
- 07 Wahoo WAH 121.925 MHz/346.375 MHz

During periods of traffic saturation in the Shenandoah Sector, ZDC will split the Shenandoah sector into two sectors, making Wahoo a second Super High Sector over the Roanoke and Lynchburg, Virginia areas. Shenandoah normally overlaps the Tech High and Gordonsville High Sectors above FL330. When traffic demand is high, Wahoo is activated to overlap the Gordonsville High Sector above FL330 covering Q75 from GVE VOR south while Shenandoah will overlap Tech High Sector above FL 330 and cover traffic on Q40 from CSN VOR south, Q103 south of ASBUR and Q69 from ZTL boundary to ILLSA.

==== High sectors ====
- 32 Gordonsville GVE 133.725/351.900
- 52 Tech TEC 133.575/270.350

==== Intermediate sectors ====
- 60 Montebello MOL 121.675/284.700

==== Low sectors ====
- 31 Azalea AZA 135.400/263.100

=== AREA 2 ===
==== High sectors ====
- 36 Raleigh RDU 118.925/322.450

==== Low sectors ====
- 26 Sampson SAM 135.300/285.500
- 27 Liberty LIB 135.200/348.650
- 28 Rocky Mount RMT 118.475/279.650

=== AREA 3 ===
==== High sectors ====
- 37 Marlinton MAR 133.025/323.025

==== Low sectors ====
- 02 Casanova CSN 133.200/282.200
- 05 Linden LDN 133.550/322.550
- 22 South Boston SBV 124.050/352.000
- 29 NEW Valley VAL (formerly Hot Springs HSP)134.400/353.900

Sector 30 OLD Valley VAL has been changed to NEW 72 Shenandoah SHD Super Hi Sector in Area 1 above. Old Valley Sector merged into Sector 29 Hot Springs.

=== AREA 4 ===
==== Super-high sectors ====
- 42 Bryce BRY 118.025/226.675

==== High sectors ====
- 03 Moorefield MOR 133.275/371.900
- 04 Pinion PIN 133.975/307.025

==== Low sectors ====
- 01 Elkins EKN 128.600/387.100
- 06 Hagerstown HGR 134.150/227.125
- 15 Blue Ridge BLR 133.650/285.600

=== AREA 5 ===
==== Super-high sectors ====
- 39 Snow Hill SWL 121.375/236.825
- 50 Yorktown YKT 120.75/317.725

==== High sectors ====
- 34 Norfolk ORF 133.825/327.800
- 54 Salisbury SBY 120.975/257.700

==== Low sectors ====
- 23 Cape Charles CCV 132.550/256.80
- 51 Casino CAS 127.700/285.400
- 53 Kenton ENO 132.050/354.150

=== AREA 6 ===
==== Super-high sectors ====
- 09 Dixon DIW 118.825/360.650

==== High sectors ====
- 35 Wilmington ILM 124.025/269.150
- 38 Tar River TYI 132.225/354.100

==== Low sectors ====
- 24 Cofield CVI 123.850/323.000
- 25 New Bern EWN 135.500/281.425
- 33 Franklin FKN 132.025/290.425

=== AREA 7 ===
==== High-altitude sectors ====
- 10 Bay BAY 132.275/379.300
- 12 Brooke BRV 126.875/327.000
- 16 Hopewell HPW 121.875/323.225

==== Intermediate sectors ====
- 11 Calvert CAL 133.900/281.400
- 20 Blackstone BKT 127.750/235.625

==== Low sectors ====
- 14 Irons IRS 132.950/351.800
- 21 Dominion DOM 118.750/377.100

=== AREA 8 ===
==== High sectors ====
- 58 Coyle CYN 121.025/254.300
- 59 Sea Isle SIE 133.125/281.450

==== High-low sectors ====
- 19 Woodstown OOD 125.450/363.000
- 18 DuPont DQO 132.525/287.900

==== Low sectors ====
- 17 Swann SWN 134.500/360.700
