= Minneapolis Air Route Traffic Control Center =

Coordinates: 44.6372°N 93.1521°W

Minneapolis Air Route Traffic Control Center (ZMP), (radio communications, "Minneapolis Center") is one of 22 Area Control Centers. It is located at 512 Division Street in Farmington, Minnesota, United States.

The primary responsibility of Minneapolis Center is sequencing and separation of overflights, arrivals, and departures, in order to provide safe, orderly, and expeditious flow of aircraft filed under instrument flight rules (IFR).

Minneapolis Center is the 14th busiest ARTCC in the United States. In 2024, Minneapolis Center handled 1,846,558 aircraft. Minneapolis Center covers approximately 330,000 square miles of the United States Midwest region, including Minnesota (especially Greater Minneapolis), most parts of Iowa, Michigan, North Dakota, South Dakota, and Wisconsin, eastern Nebraska, and small portions of Kansas and Missouri.

Minneapolis Center employs close to 400 air traffic employees, approximately 300 of whom are air traffic controllers. Minneapolis Center lies adjacent to 7 separate Area Control Centers, including Toronto Center, Winnipeg Center, Cleveland Center, Salt Lake City Center, Denver Center, Kansas City Center, and Chicago Center. Minneapolis Center overlies or abuts 18 approach control facilities including Appleton, Bismarck, Des Moines, Duluth, Fargo, Grand Forks, Green Bay, Great Lakes (Saginaw), Lincoln, Milwaukee, Minneapolis, Minot, Omaha, Rochester, Sioux City, Sioux Falls and St Joseph TRACONs and is responsible for approximately 210 uncontrolled airports with authorized instrument approach procedures.

== Basic Breakdown of Airspace ==
Minneapolis Center is divided into six Areas, numbered 1 through 6. Each area contains up to 10 sectors. Each of the six areas is delegated at least one high altitude and one low altitude sector.

=== AREA 1 ===
Area 1 is located over the northern Great Lakes. It contains five low altitude sectors and five high altitude sectors. Area 1 borders or overlies 9 approach control facilities, three class D airports, and borders 4 Area Control centers. Area 1 handles a wide array of traffic, including sequencing into Minneapolis and Chicago, several large military complexes, and provides arrival and departure services at many smaller airports. Traffic in Area 1 is extremely seasonal in nature, with traffic increasing in volume and complexity during the summer months, particularly during the EAA AirVenture air show in late July and Early August.

=== AREA 2 ===
Area 2 is a terminal arrival/departure area located to the north and east of Minneapolis and is concerned primarily with commercial aviation into and out of Minneapolis St. Paul International Airport (MSP). Traffic flow is consistent through the year with a small increase in workload in the summer due to increased general aviation activity. Area 2 also controls low altitude traffic, FL230 and below in the north half of Minnesota and most of Wisconsin. It provides approach and arrival services to all aircraft in those areas who do not have a dedicated approach control of their own.

=== AREA 3 ===
Area 3 is a terminal arrival/departure area located to the south and west of Minneapolis and is also concerned primarily with commercial aviation into and out of MSP. Area 3 works with both Minneapolis and Rochester approaches, and provides radar and non-radar services for numerous secondary airports. Complexity is increased with additional aircraft spacing to multiple large airports, including JFK, EWR, DEN and DFW and ORD.

=== AREA 4 ===
Area 4 overlies a large portion of the Midwest, including most of North Dakota, South Dakota, and northern Minnesota. A combination of low and high altitude sectors, Area 4 provides initial sequencing of MSP arrivals from the west, manages westbound MSP departures, sequences ORD arrivals, and implements traffic management initiatives for traffic landing in the northeast portion of the country. Area 4 also contains significant portions of non-radar, provides services to over 100 uncontrolled airports, works with six approach controls, and deals with significant levels of military activity.

=== AREA 5 ===
Area 5 overlies southeastern South Dakota, northeastern Nebraska, and northwestern Iowa. Area 5 is split evenly between high and low altitude, and handles a wide variety of over flight, arrival, international, and local traffic. Area 5 works with several Class D airports and 5 approach control facilities. Area 5 sequences for DEN, MSP, ORD, JFK on a daily basis and handles a wide array of military and non-radar activity.

=== AREA 6 ===
Area 6 is primarily a high altitude area, serving eastern Nebraska, and western Iowa. Area 6 consists of five high altitude sectors, and one low altitude sector and is situated between Kearney, Nebraska and Des Moines, Iowa. The area deals primarily with high altitude east and west bound traffic. Area 6 deals with sequencing to DEN, ORD, MDW, EWR, OMA, and DSM. Traffic complexity and load remains fairly consistent throughout the year.
