= Area control center =

Air traffic control facility

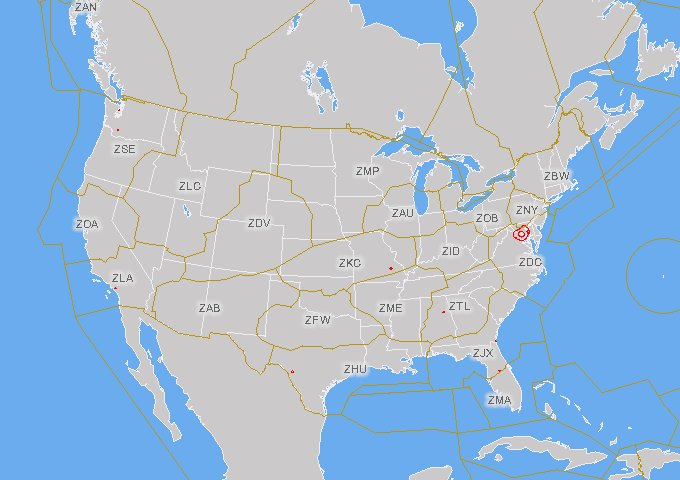
This temporary flight restriction map from the Federal Aviation Administration shows the boundaries of the regions controlled by the area control centers within and adjoining the contiguous United States, as well as the FAA location identifier of each such center operated by the United States.

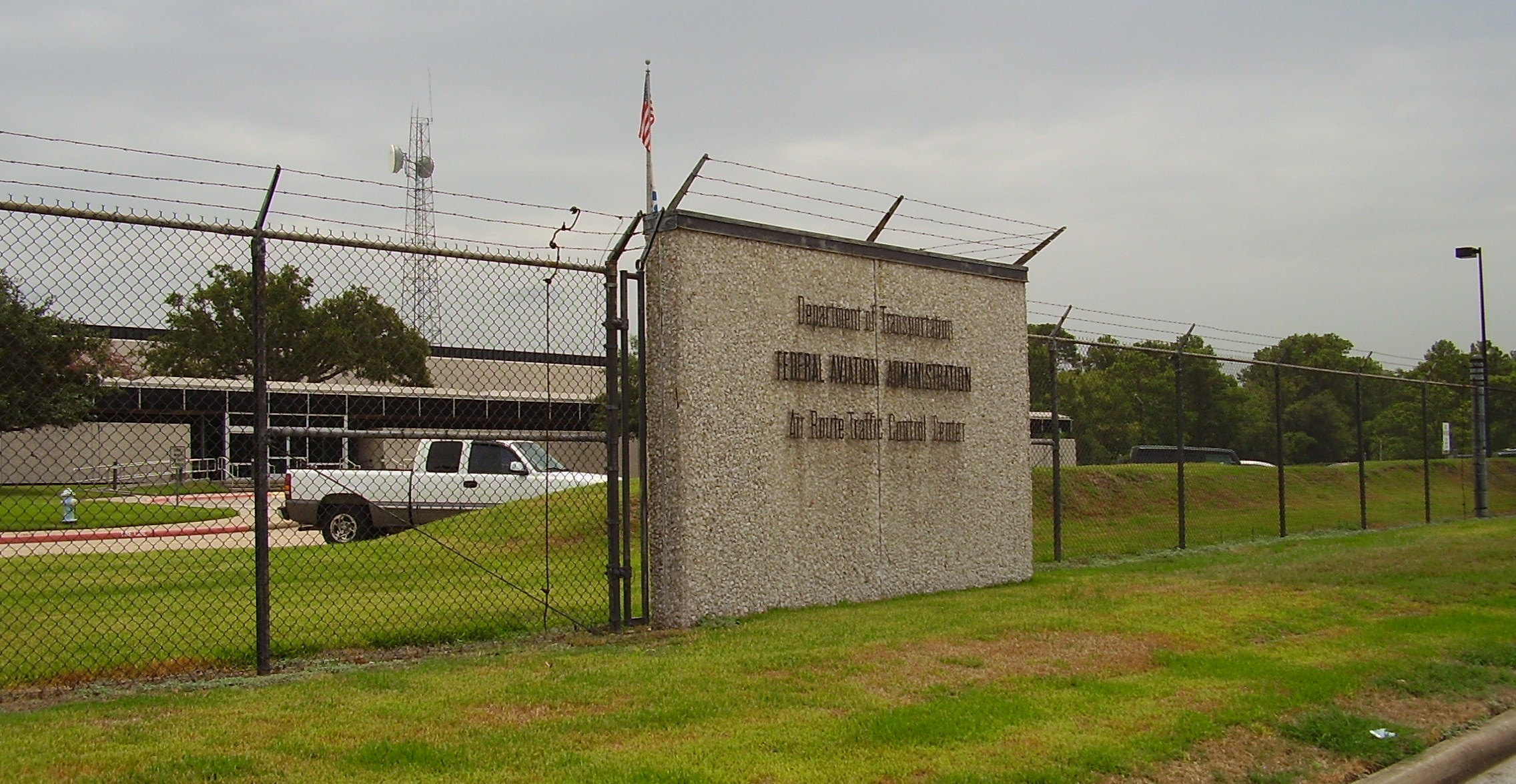
Houston Air Route Traffic Control Center, United States

In air traffic control, an area control center (ACC), also known as a center or en-route center, is a facility responsible for controlling aircraft flying in the airspace of a given flight information region (FIR) at high altitudes between airport approaches and departures. In the US, such a center is referred to as an air route traffic control center (ARTCC).

A center typically accepts traffic from—and ultimately passes traffic to—the control of a terminal control center or another center. Most centers are operated by the national governments of the countries in which they are located. The general operations of centers worldwide, and the boundaries of the airspace each center controls, are governed by the International Civil Aviation Organization (ICAO).

In some cases, the function of an area control center and a terminal control center are combined in a single facility. For example, NATS combines the London Terminal Control Centre (LTCC) and London Area Control Centre (LACC) in Swanwick, Hampshire, and NAV Canada co-locates its Victoria and Vancouver terminal control centres at its area control centre in Surrey, British Columbia.

== FAA definition ==
The United States Federal Aviation Administration (FAA) defines an ARTCC as:

[a] facility established to provide air traffic control service to aircraft operating on IFR flight plans within controlled airspace, principally during the en-route phase of flight. When equipment capabilities and controller workload permit, certain advisory/assistance services may be provided to VFR aircraft.

An ARTCC is the U.S. equivalent of an area control center (ACC). There are 22 ARTCCs located in nineteen states.

== Subdivision of airspace into sectors ==
The flight information region controlled by a center may be further administratively subdivided into areas comprising two to nine sectors. Each area is staffed by a set of controllers trained on all the sectors in that area.

Sectors use distinct radio frequencies for communication with aircraft. Each sector also has secure landline communications with adjacent sectors, approach controls, areas, ARTCCs, flight service centers, and military aviation control facilities. These landline communications are shared among all sectors that need them and are available on a first-come, first-served basis. Aircraft passing from one sector to another are handed off and requested to change frequencies to contact the next sector controller. Sector boundaries are specified by an aeronautical chart.

== Center operations ==
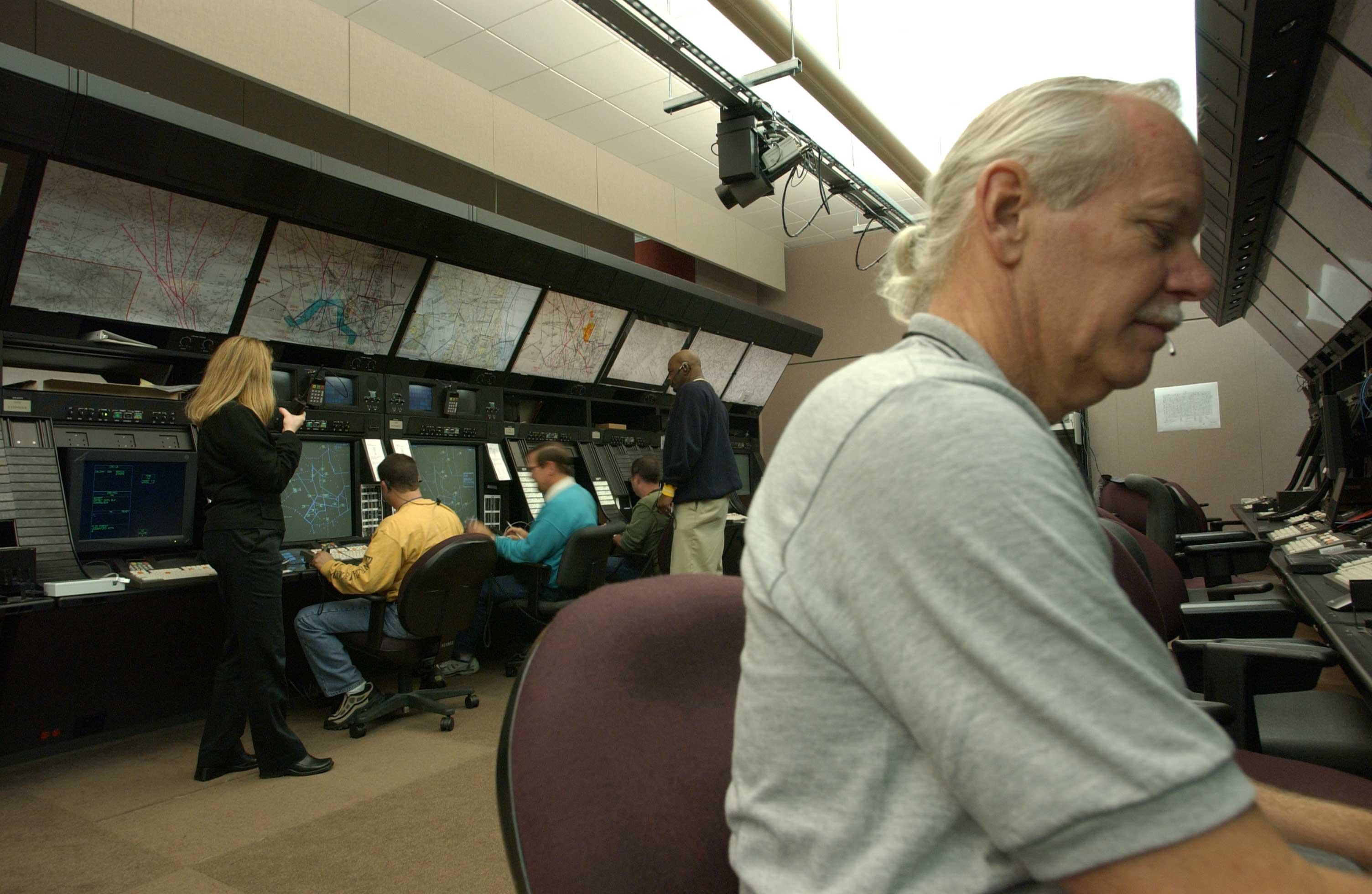
Controllers at work at the Washington Air Route Traffic Control Center, United States

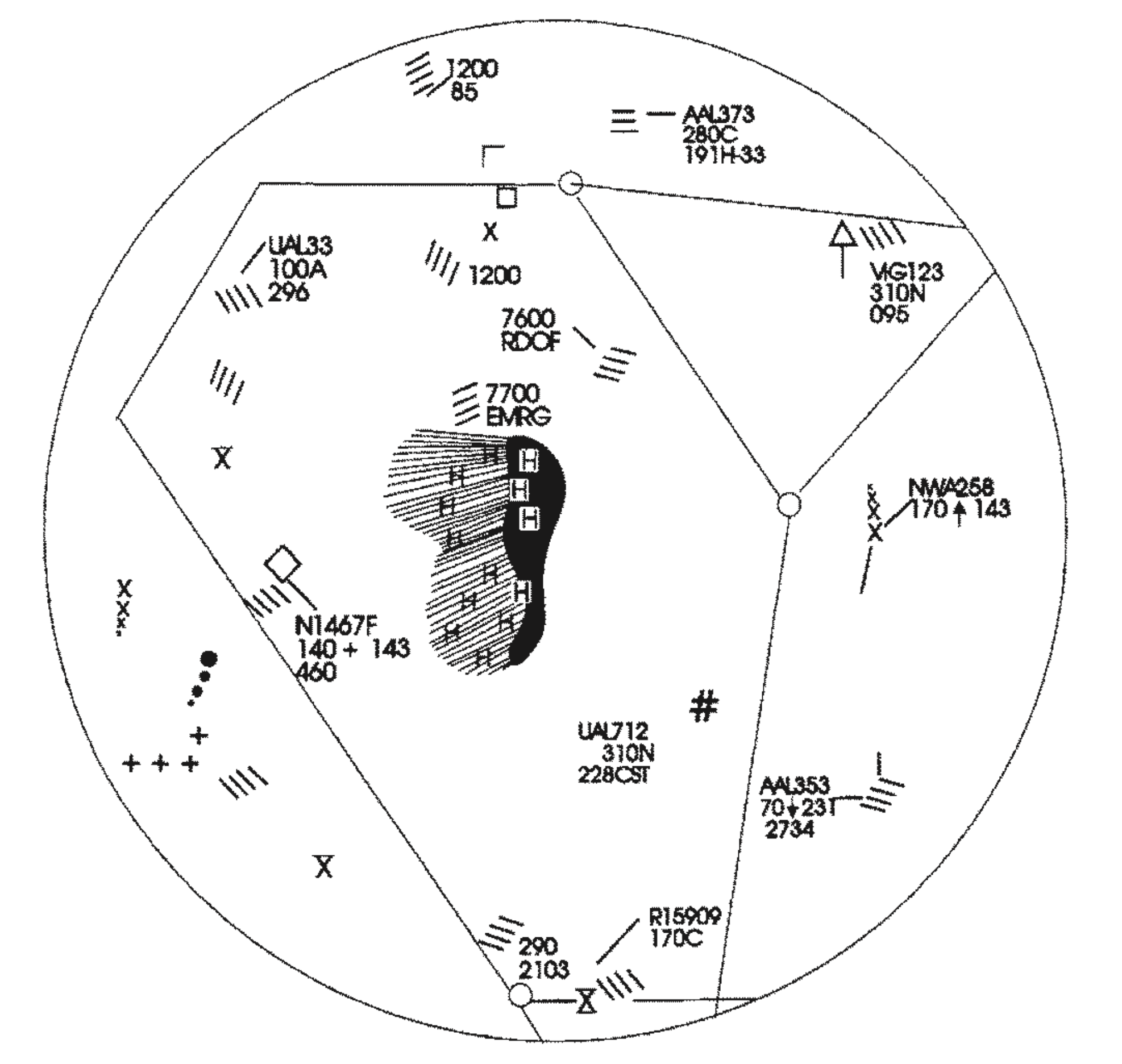
Earlier days, ARTCC radars displayed weather as an area of slashes (light precipitation) and Hs (moderate precipitation); newer radars use different shades of blue instead

Air traffic controllers working within a center communicate via radio with pilots of instrument flight rules (IFR) aircraft passing through the center's airspace. A center's communication frequencies (typically in the very high frequency aviation bands, using amplitude modulation (AM) 118 MHz to 137 MHz, for overland control) are published in aeronautical charts and manuals, and are also announced to a pilot by the previous controller during a hand-off. Most VHF radio assignments also have a UHF (225 to 380 MHz) paired frequency used for military flights.

In addition to radios to communicate with aircraft, center controllers have access to communication links with other centers and TRACONs. In the United States, centers are electronically linked through the National Airspace System, which allows nationwide coordination of traffic flow to manage congestion. Centers in the United States also have electronic access to nationwide radar data.

Controllers use operational display systems to visualize radar signals, monitor the progress of flights, and instruct aircraft to perform course adjustments as needed to maintain separation from other aircraft. Aircraft with center contact can be readily distinguished by their transponders. Pilots may request altitude adjustments or course changes for reasons including avoidance of turbulence or adverse weather conditions.

Controllers can assign routing relative to location fixes derived from latitude and longitude, or from radionavigation beacons such as VORs.

Typically, centers have advance notice of a plane's arrival and intentions from its pre-filed flight plan.

== Oceanic air traffic control ==
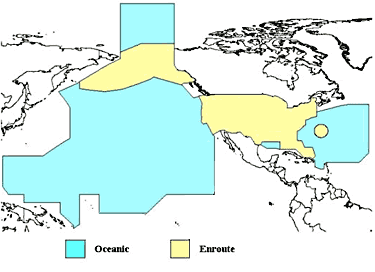
The FAA provides air traffic control services over U.S. territory and over international waters where it has been delegated such authority by the International Civil Aviation Organization. This map depicts overflight fee regions. The yellow regions are where the U.S. provides enroute ATC services (mostly over land territory). The blue regions are where the U.S. provides oceanic ATC services over international waters.

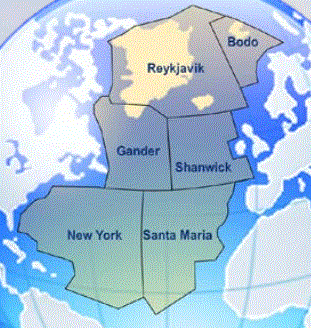
Various Oceanic Control Areas over the North Atlantic: FAA is responsible for the New York FIR

Some centers have ICAO-designated responsibility for airspace located over an ocean such as ZNY and ZOA, the majority of which is international airspace. Because substantial volumes of oceanic airspace lie beyond the range of ground-based radars, oceanic airspace controllers have to estimate the position of an airplane from pilot reports and computer models (procedural control), rather than observing the position directly (radar control, also known as positive control). Pilots flying over an ocean can determine their own positions accurately using the Global Positioning System or other means, and can supply periodic updates to a center.

A center's control service for an oceanic flight information region may be operationally distinct from its service for one over land, employing different communications frequencies, controllers, and a different ICAO code.

Pilots typically use high frequency radio instead of very high frequency radio to communicate with a center when flying over the ocean, because of HF's relatively greater propagation over long distances. Military aircraft, however, are typically equipped with ARC-231 SATCOMs that allow over-the-horizon communication.

Area control centers under Fukuoka Flight Information Region (FIR) of Japan

== See also ==
=== Related lists ===
- List of flight information regions and area control centers

=== Other links ===
- Air corridor
- Air defense identification zone
- Air traffic control
- Airspace
- Airway (aviation)
- Control area (aviation)
- Control zone
- National Track Analysis Program
- Terminal control area
