= Garrett TPF351 =

1980s American turboprop engine

TPF351
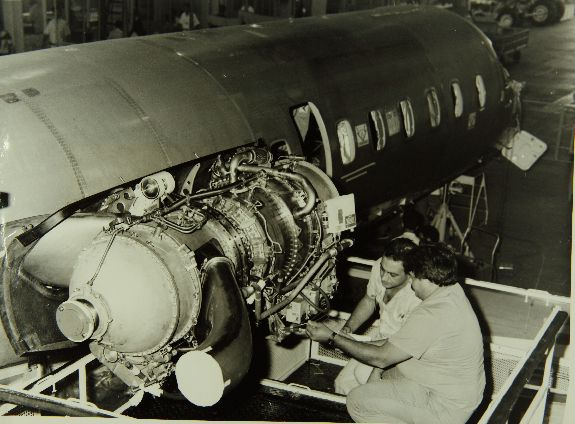
- Type: Turboprop
- National origin: United States
- Manufacturer: Garrett Engine Division of AlliedSignal Aerospace
- First run: May 19, 1989
- Major applications: Embraer/FMA CBA 123 Vector
- Developed from: Garrett TPE331

The Garrett TPF351 is a turboprop engine designed by Garrett Engine Division of AlliedSignal Aerospace Company. Initiated by Garrett in October 1987, the TPF351-20 engine was selected by Embraer to power the Embraer/FMA CBA 123 Vector, a high-speed commuter "pusher" aircraft. It was first tested on May 19, 1989 and then ground tested and flight tested on a Boeing 720 on July 9, 1990. The first prototype CBA 123 was tested on July 18, 1990, followed by a flight to the Farnborough Air Show in September of the same year. Both programs were cancelled in 1992, when the TPF351 was nine months from engine certification.

== Design ==
It was built on the 1,310 kW (1,760 hp) TPE331-14 which power the Jetstream 41, keeping its combustor system and high pressure turbine, already of the right size. The two-stage centrifugal compressor is scaled-up from the Garrett F109 turbofan of the Fairchild T-46 and Promavia Jet Squalus trainers. The engine ran about 60 °F (33 °C) hotter than the TPE331-14 in the core. It was Garrett's first free-turbine turboshaft, avoiding the high reduction gear of a single spool turboprop and allowing an easier starting since the gas generator is disengaged from the power turbine. The HP spool turns at 31,500 rpm while the LP spool turns at 19,444, reduced to 1,700 for the propeller: a 11.4 reduction ratio. Power can grow by 25% within the same size.

It is assembled from six modules: accessory gearbox, compressor, combustor, gas-generator turbine, power turbine, and propeller gearbox. The FADEC provides torque-limiting protection, propeller synchronization, auto-propeller feathering and auto-relight. It could have powered growth versions of the Beech Starship or Piaggio Avanti. A large-diameter bore hole running through the compressor and turbines allow a concentric shaft to connect the power turbine to a front-mounted gearbox to convert it to a tractor configuration.

The engine was originally called the TPE331-16, but by 1988 it was renamed to the TPF351-20. The "TPF" represented "Turbine PropFan", while the -20 suffix indicated the 2,000 shp (1,500 kW) nominal thermodynamic power rating.

== Applications ==
- Embraer/FMA CBA 123 Vector

== Specifications (TPF351-20) ==
Data from Flight International, 28 November 1990

==== General characteristics ====
- Type: Turboprop
- Length: 6.39 ft (1.95 m)
- Diameter: 1.96 ft (0.60 m)
- Dry weight: 800 lb (363 kg) with all accessories

==== Components ====
- Compressor: Two-stage centrifugal compressor
- Combustors: Reverse-flow annular combustor
- Turbine: Two-stage high-pressure axial turbine, three-stage free-power axial turbine

==== Performance ====
- Maximum power output: 1,500 hp (1,120 kW) reduction gearbox, 2,110 hp (1,570 kW) thermodynamic
- Overall pressure ratio: 14:1
- Specific fuel consumption: 0.495 lb/(hp⋅h) (301 g/kWh) in cruise
- Thrust-to-weight ratio: 1.88 hp/lb (3.09 kW/kg)

== See also ==
Related development

- Garrett TPE331
- Garrett F109

Comparable engines

- Pratt & Whitney Canada PT6
- Pratt & Whitney Canada PW100
- General Electric CT7

Related lists

- List of aircraft engines

== Bibliography ==
- Leyes, Richard A., II; Fleming, William A. (1999). The history of North American small gas turbine aircraft engines. Reston, VA: National Air and Space Museum and American Institute of Aeronautics and Astronautics (AIAA). ISBN 1-56347-332-1. OCLC 247550535.
