= Cessna T-37 Tweet =

Family of military training aircraft (1954–2009)

T-37 Tweet
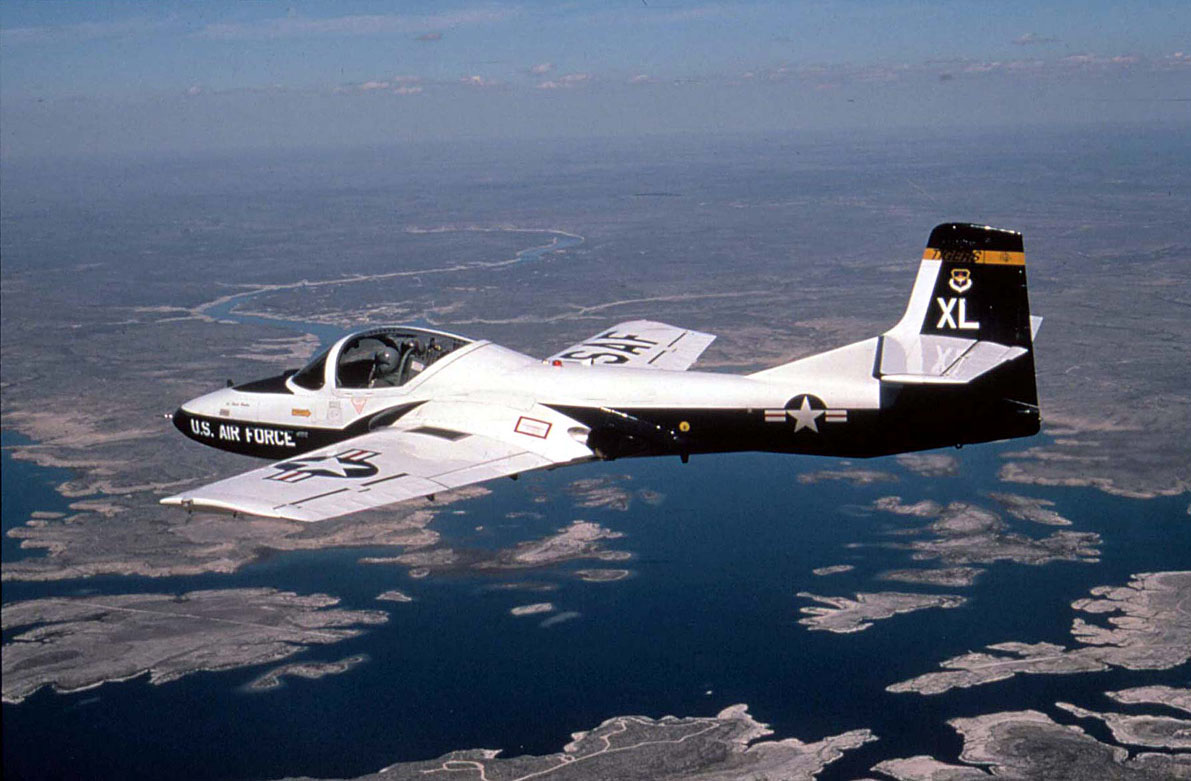
- A T-37 Tweet from the 85th Flying Training Squadron, Laughlin Air Force Base, Texas, flies over Amistad Reservoir during a training mission.

General information
- Type: Military trainer aircraft
- National origin: United States
- Manufacturer: Cessna
- Status: Retired from American service in 2009, In limited service with the Pakistan Air Force
- Primary users: United States Air Force (historical) Pakistan Air Force; Turkish Air Force (retired); Colombian Air Force (historical)
- Number built: 1,269

History
- Manufactured: 1955–1975
- Introduction date: 1957
- First flight: 12 October 1954
- Retired: 2009 (USAF)
- Variant: Cessna A-37 Dragonfly

The Cessna T-37 Tweet (designated Model 318 by Cessna) is a small, economical twin-engine jet trainer aircraft. It was flown for decades as a primary trainer of the United States Air Force (USAF) as well as in the air forces of several other nations.

The T-37 was developed in response to the launch of the "Trainer Experimental (TX)" program for the United States Air Force (USAF) in early 1952. On 12 October 1954, the prototype XT-37 performed its maiden flight. While the first prototype was lost during spin tests, features to improve handling were installed upon subsequent prototypes, such as nose-mounted strakes and a heavily redesigned large tail unit, after which the USAF chose to order the aircraft into production as the T-37A. The service received the first production aircraft during June 1956.

In response to the T-37A being underpowered, the USAF ordered an improved version, the T-37B, that was powered by uprated J-69-T-25 engines and was also equipped with improved avionics. A total of 552 new-built T-37Bs were constructed through 1973; all surviving T-37As were eventually upgraded to the T-37B standard as well. The T-37 served as the USAF's primary pilot training vehicle for over 50 years after its first flight. After completing initial training in the T-37, students progressed on to other advanced Air Force, Navy, Marine Corps or Allied trainers. A total of 1,269 T-37s were constructed prior to production ending in 1975. In 2009, the USAF withdrew its final T-37, having replaced the type with the newer turboprop-powered Beechcraft T-6 Texan II.

In addition to its use as a trainer, an armed T-37C variant was developed as a weapons trainer. A dedicated attack variant, the A-37 Dragonfly, was also developed by Cessna during the 1960s in response to a need for counter-insurgency aircraft (COIN) aircraft for the Vietnam War. Both the A-37 and T-37C were exported to various other countries, leading to their adoption by the air forces of several South American nations.

== Development ==
=== Origins ===
The T-37 can be traced back to the spring of 1952 and the issuing of a request for proposals by the United States Air Force (USAF) for what would become the "Trainer Experimental (TX)" program. The request called for a lightweight twin-seat basic trainer that would be suitable for introducing USAF cadets to jet aircraft. More specifically, the aircraft had to be simple to operate, easy to maintain, structurally strong, possess favourable low-speed handling qualities, be relatively safe while performing high altitude maneuvers, adequate fuel capacity for at least two flight hours, a service ceiling of 30,000 feet, a maximum approach speed of 113 knots, a maximum all-up weight of 4,000 lbs, and the ability to land and take off in less than 4,000 feet.

Cessna was one of eight aircraft manufacturers to respond to the TX request, the company designed a twin-jet aircraft with side-by-side seating that it internally designated as the Model 318. The USAF favorably received Cessna's submission, particularly the use of the side-by-side seating configuration as it let the student and instructor interact more closely than would be possible with tandem seating. In the spring of 1954, the USAF issued a contract to Cessna for the production of three prototypes of the Model 318 along with a separate contract for a single static test aircraft. The aircraft was designated XT-37 by the USAF. According to aviation author Kev Darling, the selection of Cessna was a surprising result as the company was only experienced with piston-engined aircraft at the time.

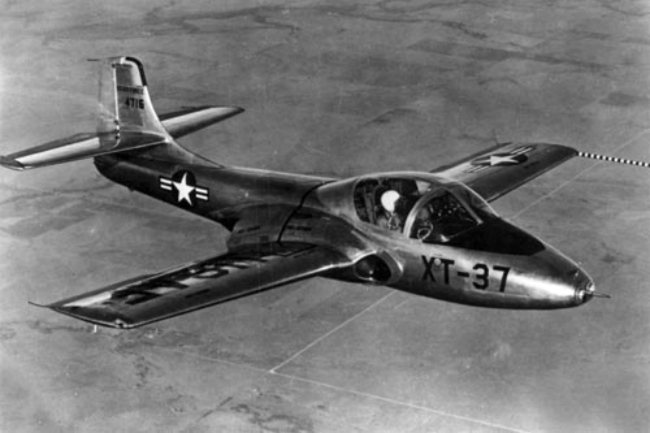
The XT-37, circa 1954

The XT-37 was an all-metal aircraft with a semi-monocoque fuselage. It was an aerodynamically clean aircraft, so much so that a speedbrake was fitted behind the nosewheel doors that would be deployed to increase drag when the aircraft was landing as well as in other phases of flight. Since the relatively short landing gear placed the engine's air intakes close to the ground, screens pivoted over the intakes from underneath when the landing gear was extended to prevent foreign object damage. The wide track and a steerable nosewheel enabled it to be relatively easy to handle on the ground while the short landing gear avoided the need for access ladders and service stands. For simplicity of maintenance, the fuselage featured in excess of 100 access panels and doors; an experienced ground crew could change an engine in about half an hour.

The XT-37 was fitted with a pair of Continental-Teledyne J69-T-9 turbojet engines, which were French Turbomeca Marboré engines produced under license, each being capable of generating up to 920 lbf (4.1 kN) of thrust. These engines were equipped with thrust attenuators that permitted them to remain spooled-up (i.e. rotating at speeds above idle) during landing approach, permitting shorter landings while still allowing the aircraft to easily make another go-around in case something went wrong. The empty weight of the XT-37 was 5,000 lb (2,300 kg).

The XT-37 had a low, straight wing while the engines buried in the wing roots, a clamshell-type canopy hinged to open vertically to the rear, a control layout similar to that of contemporary operational USAF aircraft, ejection seats, and tricycle landing gear with a wide track of 14 ft (4.3 m). Many of the aircraft's components were designed and built internally by Cessna; relatively few external contractors were involved in the production.

On 12 October 1954, the XT-37 performed its maiden flight. Flight testing revealed the XT-37 to have a maximum speed of 390 mph (630 km/h) at altitude and a range of 935 mi (1,505 km). Furthermore, it possessed a service ceiling of 35,000 feet (10,700 m); however, due to the cockpit being unpressurized, it was limited to an operational ceiling of 25,000 feet (7,600 m) by USAF regulations.

The initial prototype crashed during spin tests. To improve handling, subsequent prototypes were equipped with new aerodynamic features, such as lengthy strakes along the nose and an extensively redesigned and enlarged tail. On 3 May 1955, the third and final prototype took flight for the first time. After these modifications were implemented, the USAF found the aircraft to be acceptable to their needs and ordered it into production as the T-37A. Despite the changes, production aircraft remained tricky to correctly recover from a spin; it had a relatively complex recovery procedure in comparison to most aircraft. If fuel distribution was not managed correctly, a weight imbalance situation could be created that may lead to an unrecoverable stall.

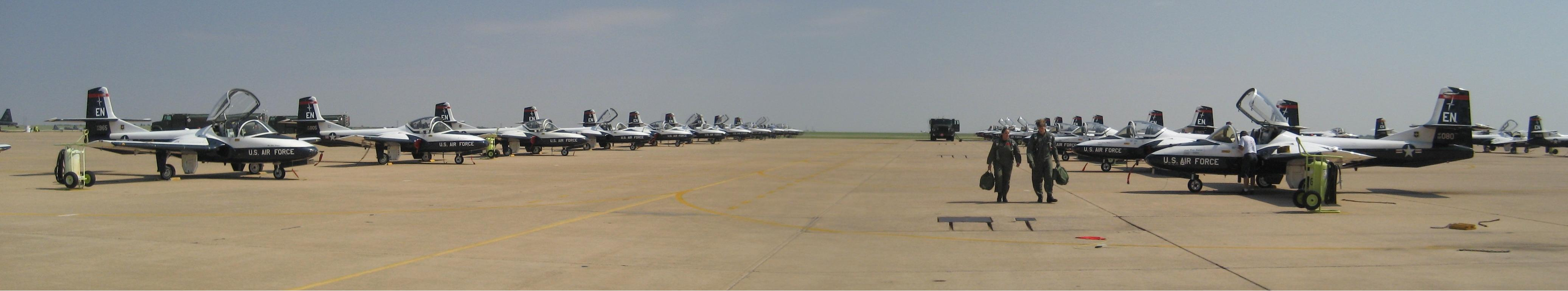
A panorama of T-37s at Sheppard AFB in 2007 operated as part of the Euro-NATO Joint Jet Pilot Training Program.

=== Production ===
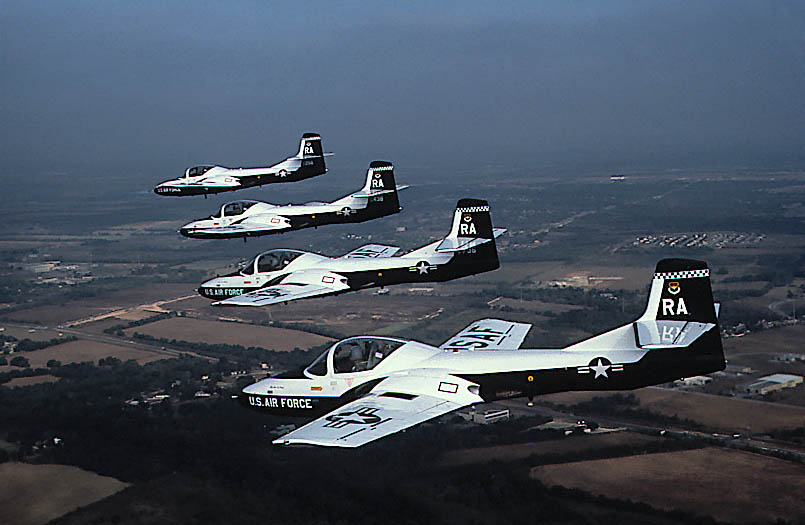
A formation of four T-37s, circa 2000

The production T-37A was similar to the XT-37 prototypes, differing only in only minor ways as to address problems revealed by flight testing. During September 1955, the first T-37A was completed, it made its first flight later that year. The USAF ultimately ordered 444 T-37As, the last of which was produced in 1959. During 1957, the US Army evaluated three T-37As for battlefield observation and other combat support roles, but eventually procured the Grumman OV-1 Mohawk for this purpose instead. Darling alleges that this outcome had been largely due to political factors, including the opposition of the USAF.

USAF officials reportedly liked the T-37A but often considered it to be underpowered; consequently, the service ordered an improved version, the T-37B. It was outfitted with uprated J-69-T-25 engines that provided roughly 10 percent more thrust as well as being more reliable. The new variant also featured improved avionics, fuel flow improvements, as well as various changes to reduce maintenance requirements. A total of 552 newly built T-37Bs was constructed through 1973. All surviving T-37As were progressively upgraded to the T-37B configuration as well, the rebuilding program being completed by July 1960.

Following a series of accidents caused by bird strikes between 1965 and 1970, all T-37s were later retrofitted with a new windshield made of Lexan polycarbonate plastic 0.5 in (12.7 mm) thick; this had sufficient strength to reliably withstand the impact of a 4 lb (1.8 kg) bird at a relative speed of 288 mph (463 km/h). While early examples of this new windshield suffered from distortion, this was rectified via production changes.

In 1962, Cessna suggested the T-37B as a replacement for the North American F-100 Super Sabre as the primary aircraft for the USAF aerobatic demonstration team, the Thunderbirds, but the USAF was satisfied with the F-100.

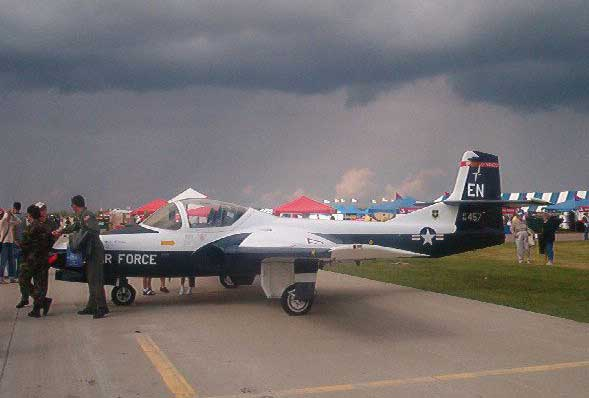
A T-37B at an airshow

The T-37A and T-37B had no built-in armament and lacked any stores pylons for external armament. During 1961, Cessna began developing a modest enhancement of the T-37 for use as a weapons trainer. The new variant, the designated T-37C, was intended for export and could be used for light attack duties if required. The prototype T-37C was a modified T-37B; the principal changes made included strengthened wings and the addition of a stores pylon under each wing outboard of the main landing gear well. The T-37C could also be fitted with a reconnaissance camera mounted inside the fuselage. It could also be fitted with wingtip fuel tanks, each with a capacity of 65 US gal (245 L), that could be dropped in an emergency.

The primary armament of the T-37C was the General Electric "multipurpose pod" with a .50 caliber (12.7 mm) machine gun with 200 rounds, two 70 mm (2.75 in) folding-fin rocket pods, and four practice bombs. Other stores, such as folding-fin rocket pods or Sidewinder air-to-air missiles, could be carried. A computing gunsight and gun camera were also added. The changes increased the weight of the T-37C by 1,430 lb (650 kg). As the engines were not upgraded, the changes caused a reduction in the aircraft's top speed to 595 km/h (370 mph), though the wingtip tanks increased its maximum range to 1,770 km (1,100 mi).

Production of the T-37 slowed considerably during the early 1960s, although there was an uptake during the latter half of the decade, both to address attrition and an uptick in demand as the Vietnam War intensified. Around this time, the aircraft was authorised for supply to friendly overseas operators under the Military Aid for Assistance programme. Production of the T-37 was terminated in 1975. By this point, export sales of the type included 273 T-37Cs. This was on top of the 444 T-37As and 552 T-37Bs produced for both domestic and export customers for a total of 1,269 aircraft built.

=== Further development and concept aircraft ===
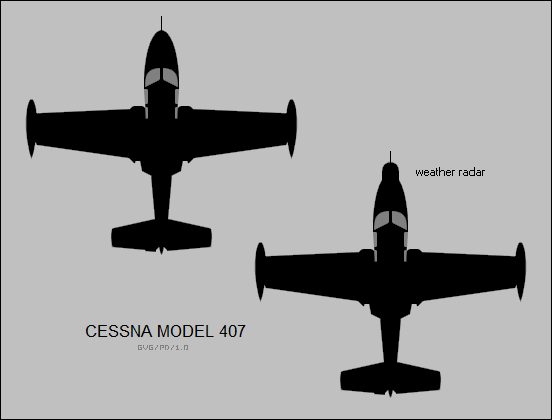
Cessna Model 407 concept

A dedicated attack variant of the T-37, referred to as the A-37 Dragonfly, was developed during the 1960s. This was largely in response to the Vietnam War, for which the USAF came to recognize the need for dedicated counter-insurgency aircraft (COIN) aircraft to engage with the ground forces of North Vietnam. Being derived from the T-37, the USAF had determined that a prospective COIN model would need to be able to carry a far greater payload, have more endurance, and possess better short-field performance. Specific alterations made included the adoption of strengthened wings, the use of larger wingtip fuel tanks of 360 litres (95 US gal) capacity, additional avionics suitable for battlefield communications, navigation, and targeting, toughened landing gear that were suitable for rough-field operation, and the fitting of a General Electric-supplied GAU-2B/A 7.62 mm (0.300 in) "Minigun" Gatling-style machine gun capable of a rate of fire of 3,000 rounds/minute and 1,500 rounds of ammunition that was installed in the aircraft's nose along with an accompanying gunsight and gun camera. Three stores pylons were installed on each wing that were compatible with various munitions. This A-37 would not only be used in frontline combat in Vietnam, but was also exported to various other air forces, including several South American nations.

Cessna proposed a number of innovative variants of the T-37 that never went into production. In 1959, Cessna built a prototype of a light jet transport version of the T-37, designated the Cessna Model 407, which was stretched 2 ft (61 cm) to accommodate a four-place pressurized cockpit with an automobile-type configuration. Only a wooden mockup of the Model 407 was constructed. The project was cancelled due to insufficient customer interest.

The company also proposed a similar four-place military light transport, the Model 405, with a large clamshell canopy, but it was never built.

In response to a United States Navy "Tandem Navy Trainer" (TNT) requirement, Cessna proposed a T-37 with a modified fuselage featuring a tandem cockpit. The Navy selected the North American T-2 Buckeye, instead.

Cessna proposed various other trainer derivatives for the US Navy and USAF, including a vertical takeoff version based on the TNT configuration and incorporating lift-jet pods in the wings, but none of them reached the prototype stage.

== Operational history ==
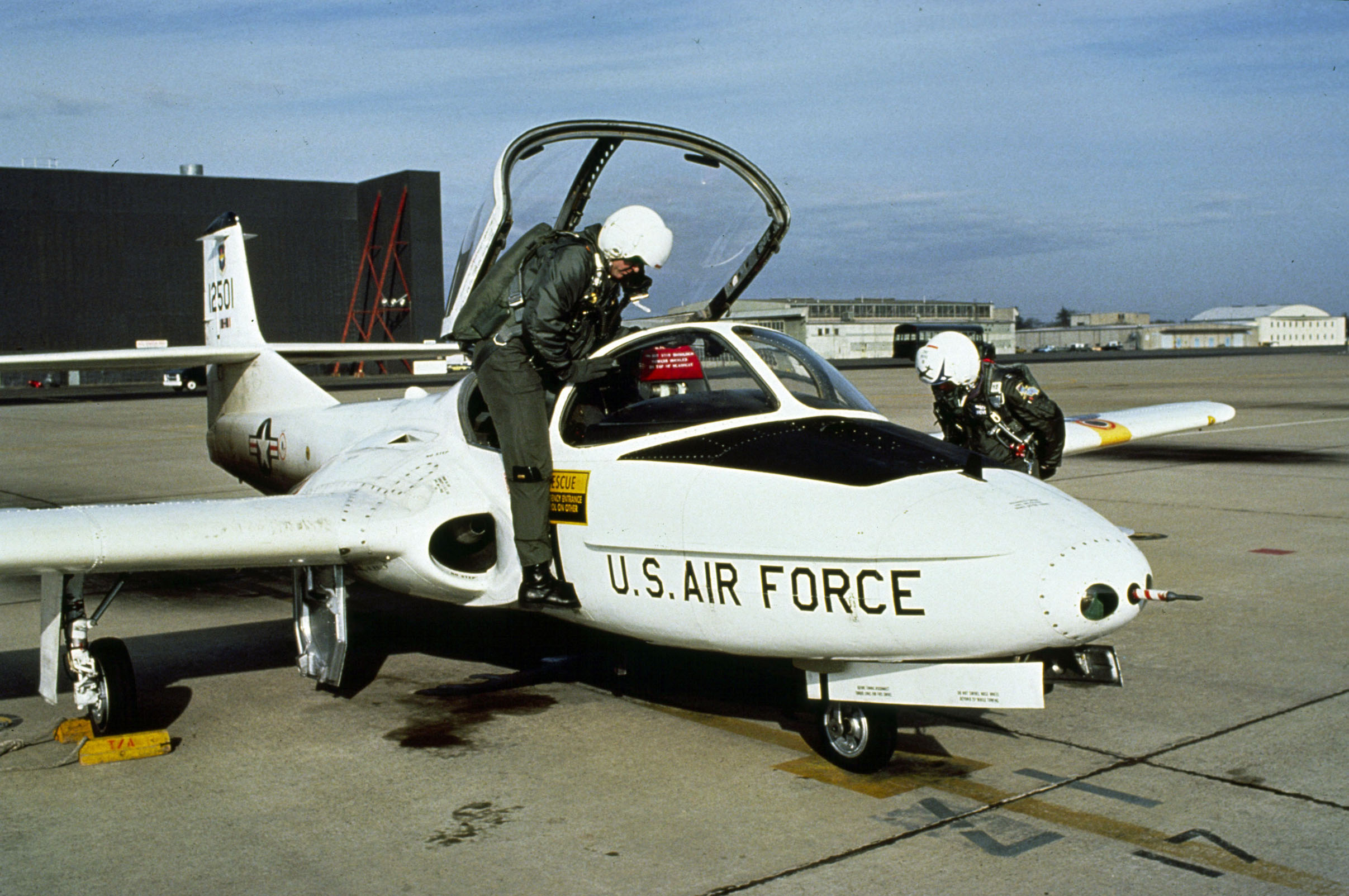
T-37B Tweet in the 1980s

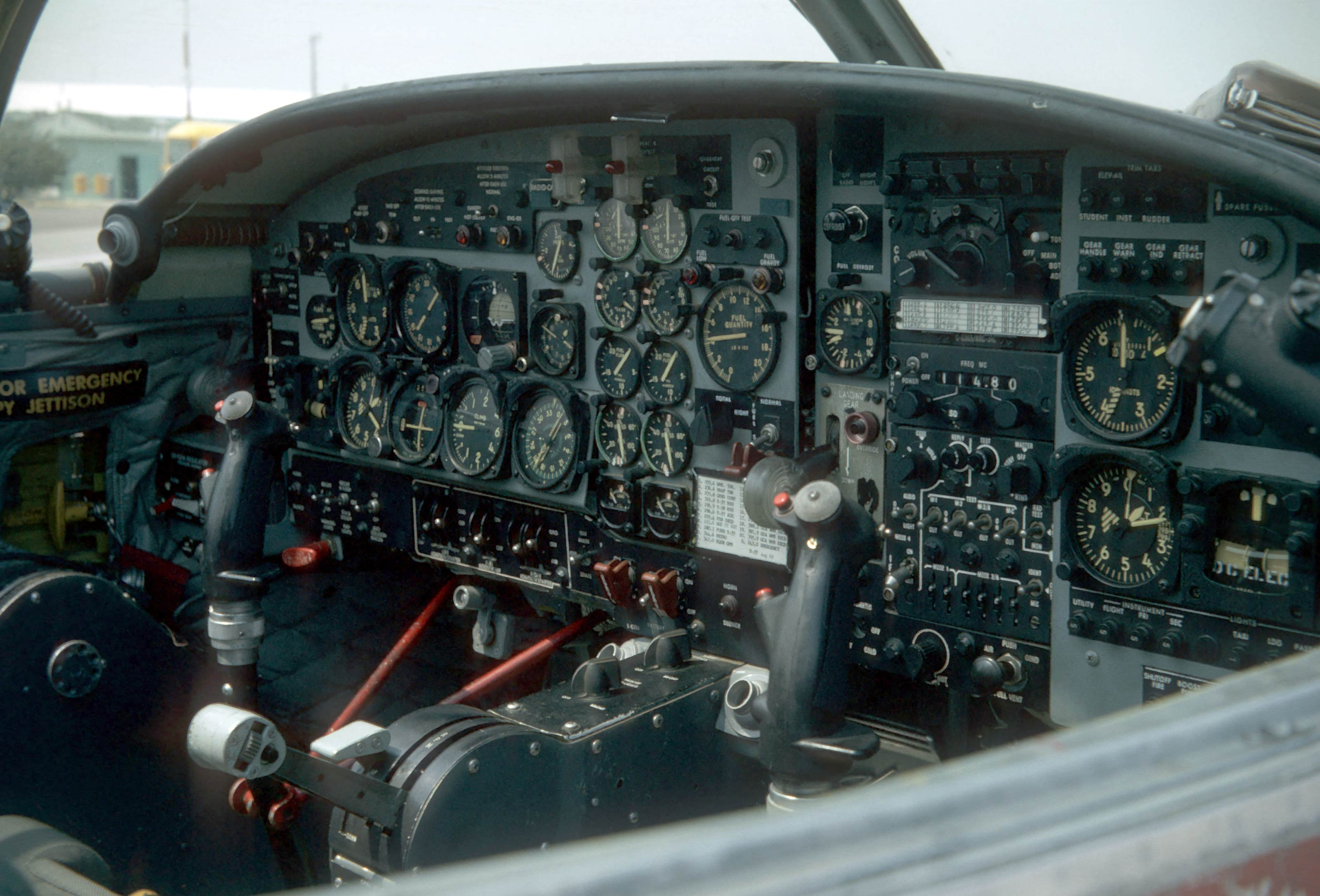
T-37 cockpit in 1969

During June 1956, deliveries of the T-37A commenced to the USAF; the service began both Aviation Cadet and commissioned officer pilot training using the type during the following year. The first T-37B was delivered in 1959. Instructors and students typically considered the T-37A to be a pleasant aircraft to fly, handling relatively well, being agile and responsive, though it was definitely not overpowered. It was capable of all traditional aerobatic maneuvers. Students intentionally placed the aircraft into a spin as part of their pilot training.

The T-37A was very noisy even by the standards of jet aircraft. The intake of air into its small turbojets emitted a high-pitched shriek that led some to describe the trainer as the "Screaming Mimi", the "6,000 pound dog whistle" or "Converter" (converts fuel and air into noise and smoke). The piercing whistle gave rise to the T-37's nickname of "Tweety Bird", which was regularly shortened to "Tweet". The USAF expended a considerable amount of time and money on soundproofing buildings at bases where the T-37 was stationed while ear protection were mandatory for all personnel when near an operating aircraft.

By 1996, a total of 132 aircraft had been lost in Class A accidents and 75 fatalities had been incurred, the majority of which were attributed to pilot error. Common errors included inadvertently shutting down the engines via throttle mismanagement, use of the aircraft in cold weather conditions, and oil system issues.

During the late 1970s, amid rising tensions between Argentina and Chile over conflicting territorial claims, commonly referred to be as the Beagle conflict, the Chilean Air Force retrofitted their T-37s into an armed configuration near identical to that of the A-37. Similarly, the Colombian Air Force decided to reorient its T-37Cs from training to light attack duties during the early 1980s.

Over the decades, the USAF made several attempts to replace the T-37, such as the abortive Fairchild T-46, however it remained in service with the USAF into the twenty-first century. The T-37 was ultimately phased out in favor of the Beechcraft T-6 Texan II between 2001 and 2009. The T-6 is a turboprop aircraft that possesses more power, better fuel efficiency, and more modern avionics than the T-37. The final USAF student training sortie by a T-37B in the Air Education and Training Command took place on 17 June 2009. The last USAF operator of the T-37B, the 80th Flying Training Wing, flew the sortie from its home station at Sheppard Air Force Base, Texas. The last T-37B was officially retired from active USAF service on 31 July 2009.

== Variants ==
XT-37
Two-seat jet trainer prototype aircraft, powered by two Continental YJ69-T-9 turbojet engines; three built (54-716 – 54-718).

T-37A
Two-seat basic jet trainer aircraft, powered by two Continental J69-T-9 turbojet engines; 534 built.

T-37B
Two-seat basic jet trainer aircraft, powered by two Continental J69-T-25 turbojet engines, fitted with improved navigation and communications equipment.

T-37C
Two-seat basic jet trainer, light-attack aircraft, fitted with two weapons pylons, one under each wing; 269 built.

XAT-37D
Two-seat counter-insurgency, light-attack prototype aircraft; two built. Developed into A-37 Dragonfly.

YT-48A
Proposed development with two Garrett F109-GA-100 engines; none built.

B.F.12
(Thai: บ.ฝ.๑๒) Royal Thai Armed Forces designation for the T-37B/C.

== Operators ==
Ecuador
Ecuadorian Air Force – 10 T-37Bs.
Pakistan
Pakistan Air Force – First bought in 1962. 62 aircraft. 24 T-37Bs and 39 T-37Cs were confirmed to be part of the inventory. In 2008 20 T-37s were delivered that were ordered from the U.S. On 28 October 2015, the Turkish Air Force gave the Pakistan Air Force 34 T-37Cs, including spares in an agreement between Turkey and Pakistan. On October 9, 2024, one of the T-37s crashed on a routine training mission in the Swabi district of Khyber Pakhtunkhwa bringing down the inventory from 63 aircraft to 62. Both pilots ejected safely.

=== Former operators ===
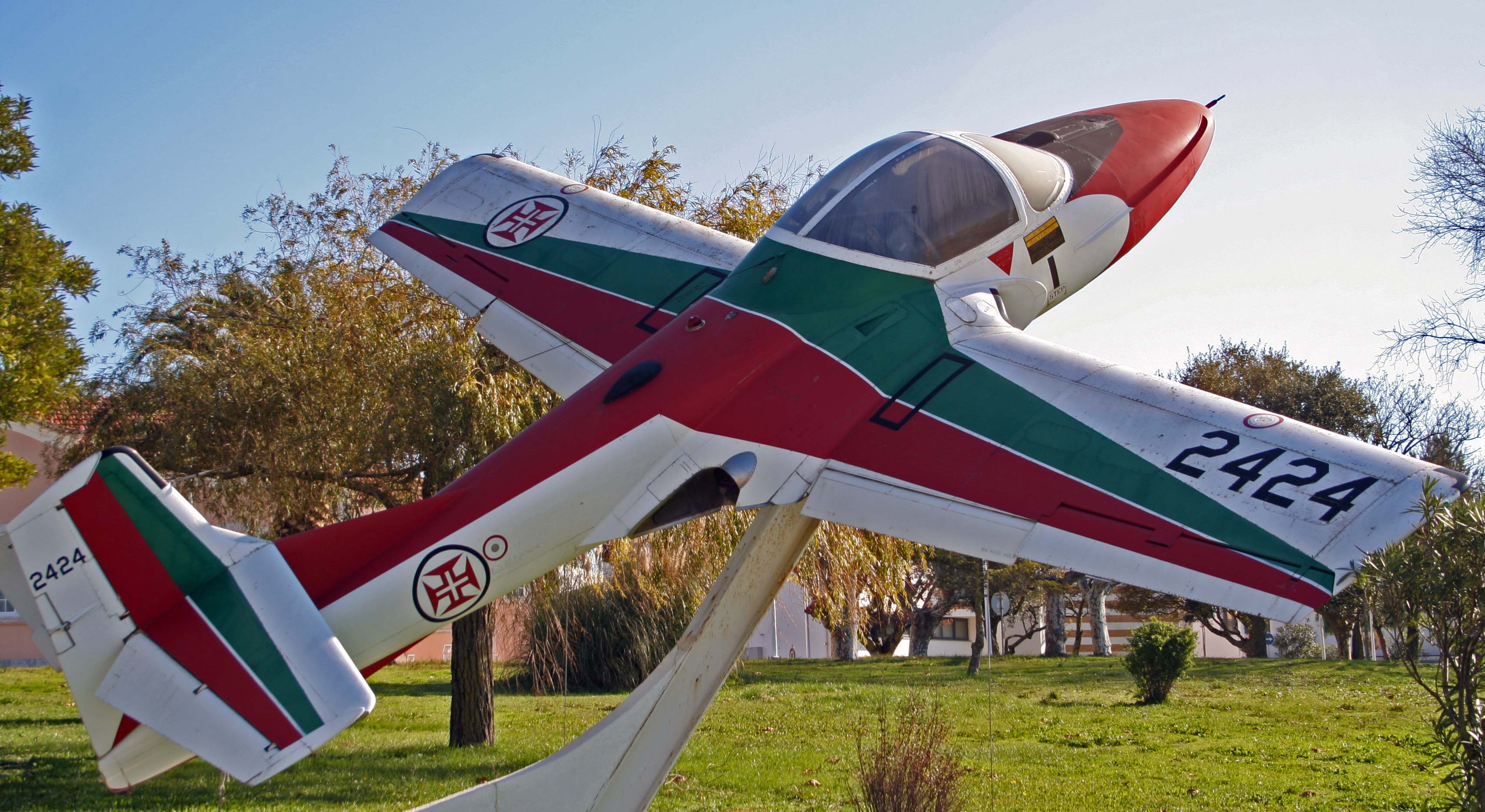
A former Portuguese Air Force aerobatic team Asas de Portugal T-37 on display

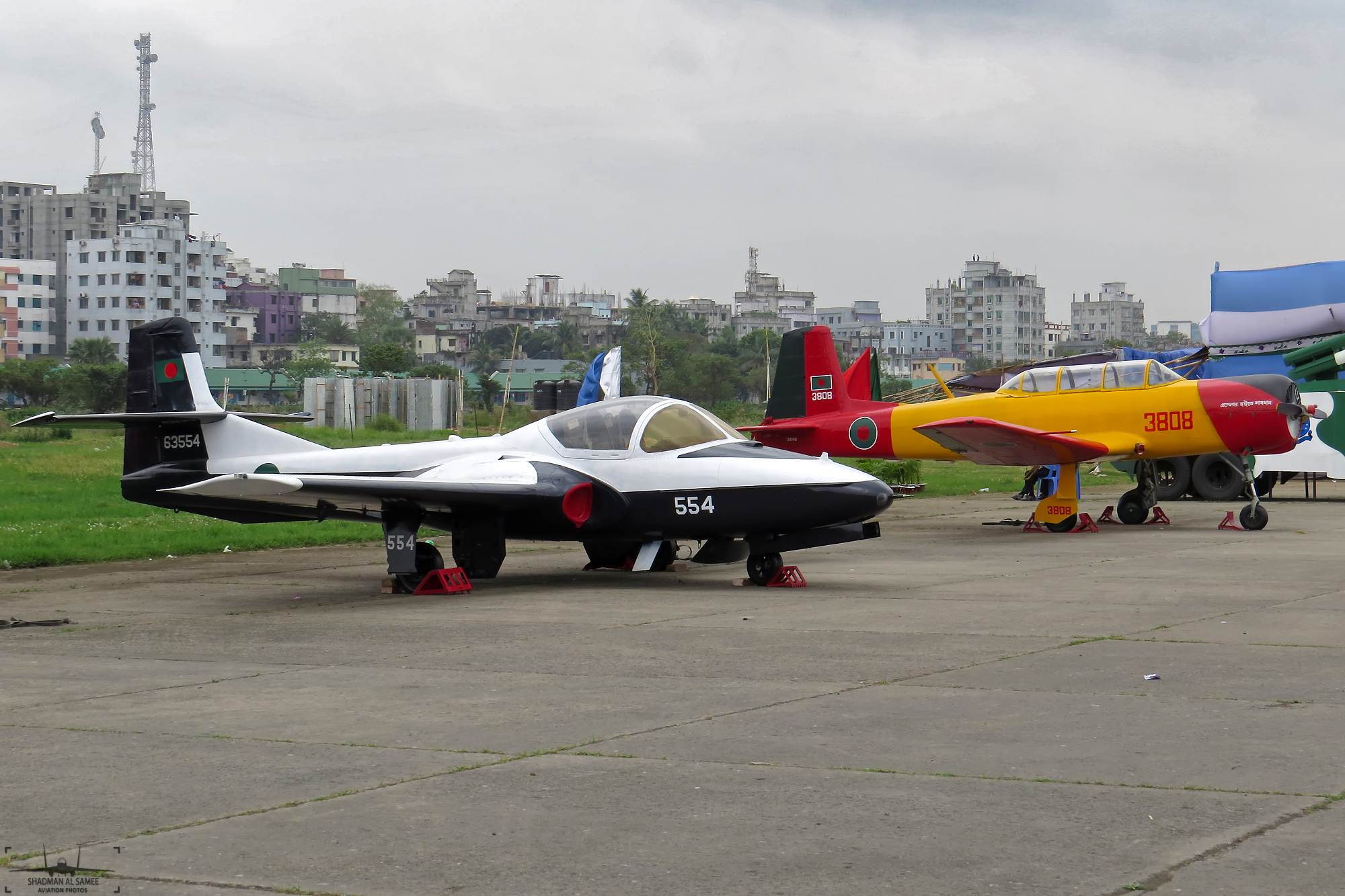
Bangladesh Air Force T-37B and a PT-6 on static display

T-37s, including both new-build and ex-USAF aircraft, were supplied to a number of countries, including:

Bangladesh
Bangladesh Air Force received total of 12 T-37B aircraft from US. Deal for additional T-37s from Pakistan never transpired, all remaining Cessna T-37Bs Tweet in reserve at Jessor Air Base under squadron 15. Retired from active service.
Brazil
Brazilian Air Force – 65 T-37Cs, later passing 30 on to South Korea and 12 on to Paraguay, which were never delivered due to US veto.
Burma
Burmese Air Force – 12 T-37Cs.
Chile
Chilean Air Force – 32 aircraft, including 20 T-37Bs and 12 T-37Cs. Both variants were phased out in 1998.
Colombia
Colombian Air Force – 14 aircraft, including 4 T-37Bs and 10 T-37Cs. The last two aircraft were retired on July 10, 2021.
Germany
German Air Force – 47 T-37Bs now retired, superseded by the T-6 Texan II
Greece
Hellenic Air Force – 32 aircraft, including 8 T-37Bs and 24 T-37Cs.
Jordan
Royal Jordanian Air Force – 15 aircraft, apparently ex-USAF T-37Bs.
Khmer Republic
Khmer Air Force – 24 T-37Bs.
Portugal
Portuguese Air Force – 30 T-37Cs, received from 1963, grounded in 1991 and phased out in 1992. Superseded by the Alpha Jet. From 1977 to 1991, some of the T-37Cs were used by the aerobatic demonstration team Asas de Portugal (Wings of Portugal).
Peru
Peruvian Air Force – 32 T-37Bs.
Pakistan
Pakistan Air Force – 52 T-37Bs.

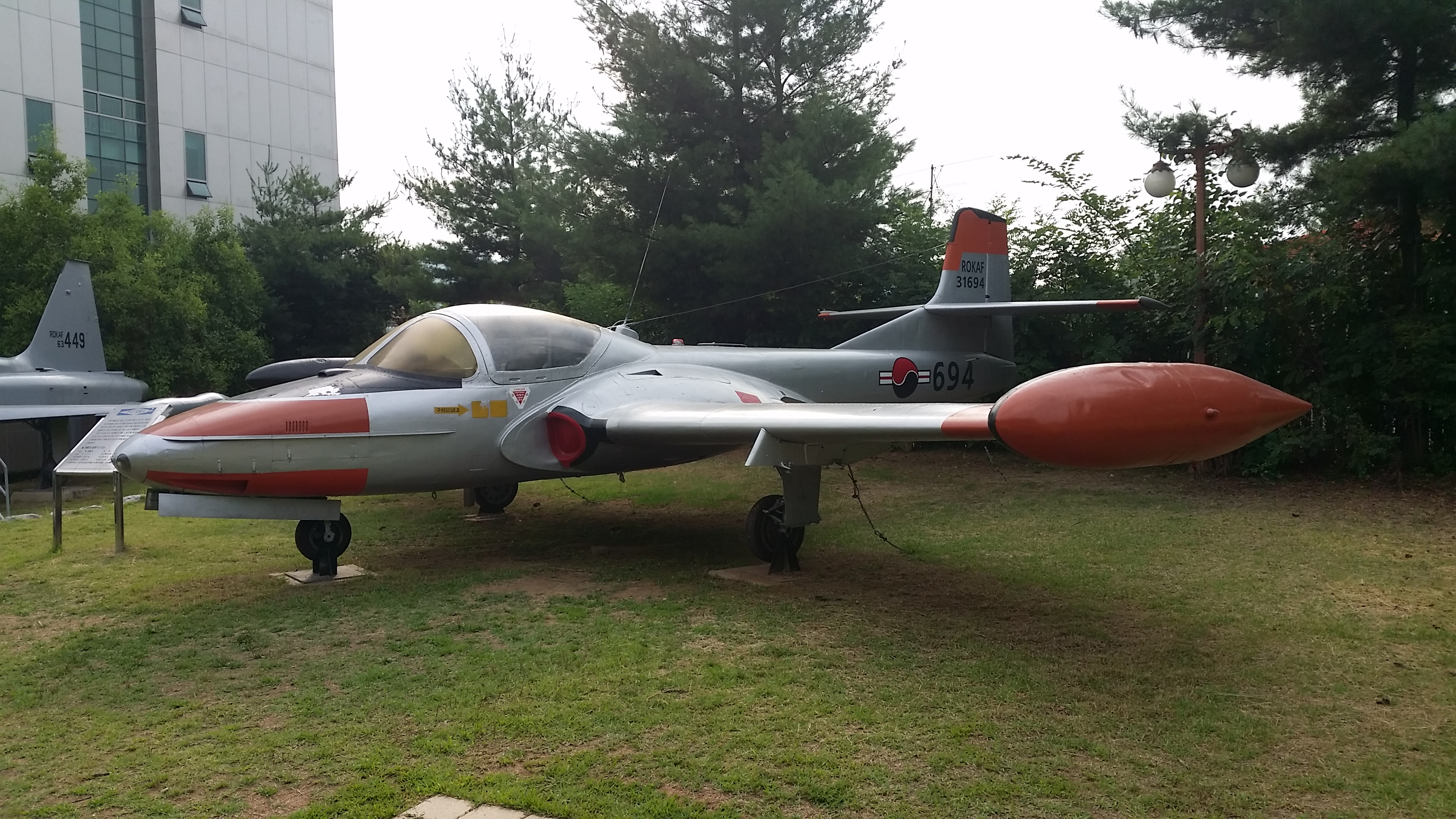
South Korean T-37C at Korea Aerospace University

South Korea
ROK Air Force – originally 25 T-37Cs, plus 30 later bought from Brazil. First introduced: June 1973.
South Vietnam
Republic of Vietnam Air Force – 24 T-37Bs.
Thailand
Royal Thai Air Force – 16 aircraft, including 10 T-37Bs and 6 T-37Cs.
Turkey
Turkish Air Force – 65 T-37Cs.
United States
United States Air Force
Vietnam
Vietnam People's Air Force – captured ex-South Vietnamese T-37Bs
Morocco
Royal Moroccan Air Force – 14 aircraft, received in 1995. Retired from active service.

== Specifications (T-37B) ==
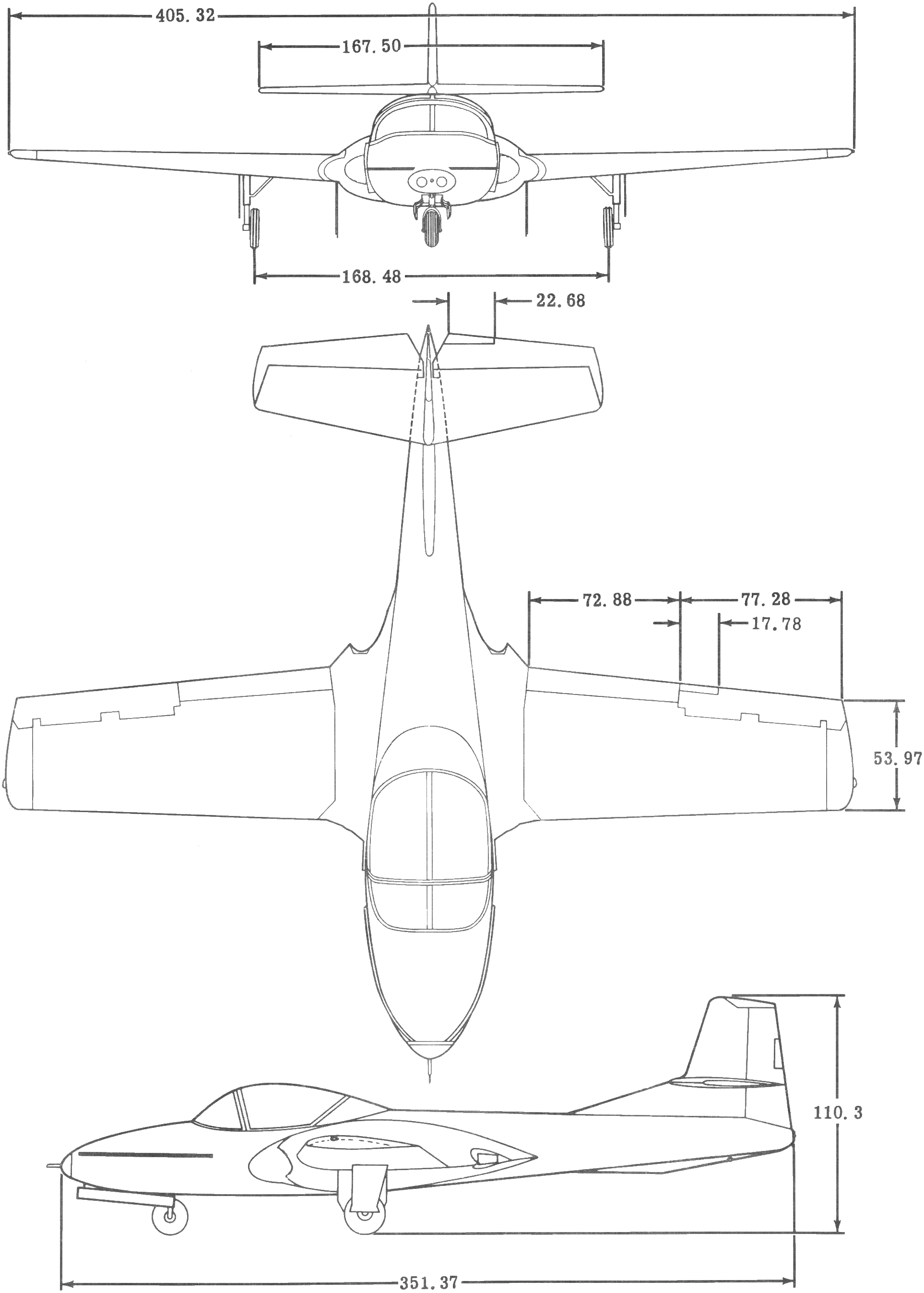
3-view line drawing of the Cessna T-37B Tweet

Data from Jane's All the World's Aircraft 1965–66, A-37/T-37 Dragonfly in Action

General characteristics

- Crew: 2
- Length: 29 ft 3 in (8.92 m)
- Wingspan: 33 ft 9.32 in (10.2951 m)
- Height: 9 ft 2 in (2.79 m)
- Wing area: 201 sq ft (18.7 m^{2})
- Aspect ratio: 6.2:1
- Airfoil: NACA 2418 at root, NACA 2412 at tip
- Empty weight: 4,056 lb (1,840 kg)
- Max takeoff weight: 6,574 lb (2,982 kg)
- Powerplant: 2 × Continental-Teledyne J69-T-25 turbojets, 1,025 lbf (4.56 kN) thrust each

Performance

- Maximum speed: 425 mph (684 km/h, 369 kn)
- Cruise speed: 360 mph (580 km/h, 310 kn) at 35,000 ft (11,000 m)
- Stall speed: 85 mph (137 km/h, 74 kn)
- Range: 932 mi (1,500 km, 810 nmi)
- Service ceiling: 38,700 ft (11,800 m)
- Rate of climb: 3,370 ft/min (17.1 m/s)

Armament

- Total stores stations: None (T-37A/B), 2 underwing for stores up to 500 lb (227 kg) (T-37C)

== See also ==
Related development

- Cessna A-37 Dragonfly

Aircraft of comparable role, configuration, and era

- BAC Jet Provost
- Canadair CT-114 Tutor
- Saab 105
- Temco TT Pinto
- Aero L-29 Delfín
- Fouga Magister

Related lists

- List of active United States military aircraft
- List of military aircraft of the United States
