= Embraer/FMA CBA 123 Vector =

Regional airliner prototype

CBA 123 Vector
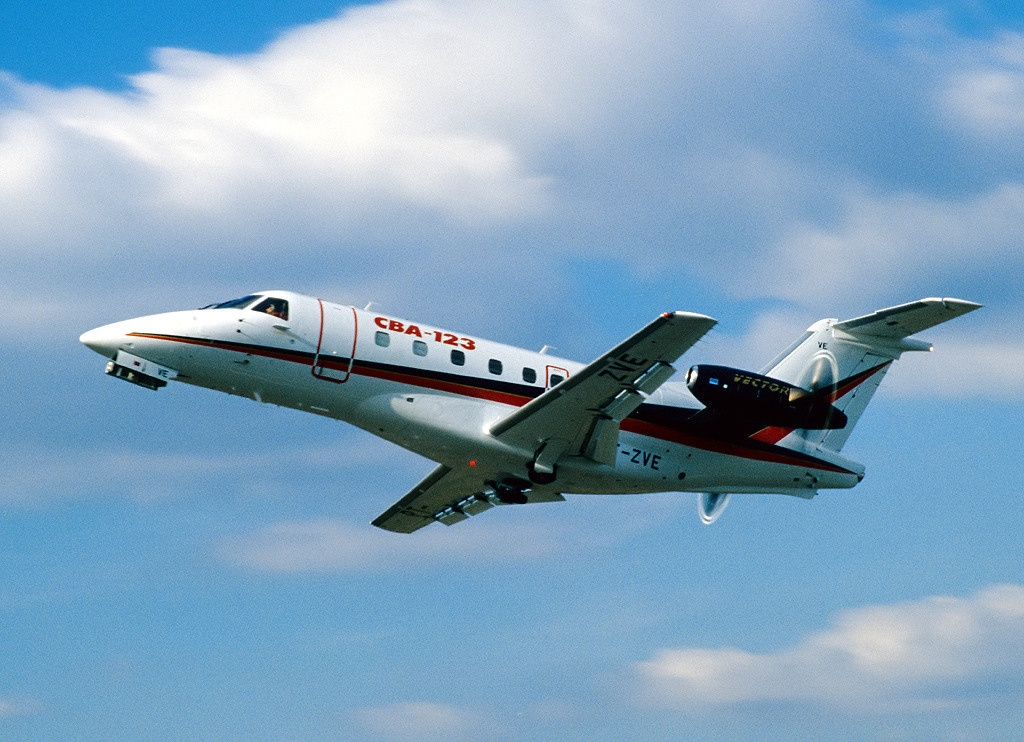
- In flight at the 1990 Farnborough Air Show.

General information
- Type: Light business aircraft or 19-seat regional airliner
- Manufacturer: Embraer/Fábrica Militar de Aviones
- Status: Prototype
- Number built: Two; third prototype unfinished

History
- First flight: 18 July 1990
- Developed from: Embraer EMB 120
- Developed into: Embraer ERJ 145

The Embraer/FMA CBA 123 Vector (originally EMB 123 for Embraer and IA 70 for FMA) is a 1990 turboprop aircraft designed for regional flights, to carry up to 19 passengers. The program arose from a partnership between the Brazilian company Embraer and the Argentine FMA. The project was an advanced turboprop aircraft for its time, including advanced technology in avionics, aerodynamics, and propulsion.

== Development ==
By 1985, economic integration of South America seemed to be in progress with advances in the negotiations of Mercosur between the Brazilian and Argentine governments. Meanwhile, in 1985, the Brazilian aircraft manufacturer Embraer, having commenced production of its EMB 120 Brasilia 30-seat turboprop airliner, started the design process for a 19-seat airliner to replace Embraer's aging EMB 110 Bandeirante. In 1986, as a way of encouraging partnership between both countries, an agreement to develop a Brazilian-Argentine aircraft was signed between Embraer and the Argentine company Fabrica Militar de Aviones (FMA). Initially called the EMB 123, the aircraft was expected to sell for USD3 million and earn sales of USD750 million through the year 2000. The name "CBA" stood for "Cooperación Brasil-Argentina" (Spanish), and "Cooperação Brasil-Argentina" (Portuguese), meaning Brazil-Argentina Cooperation.

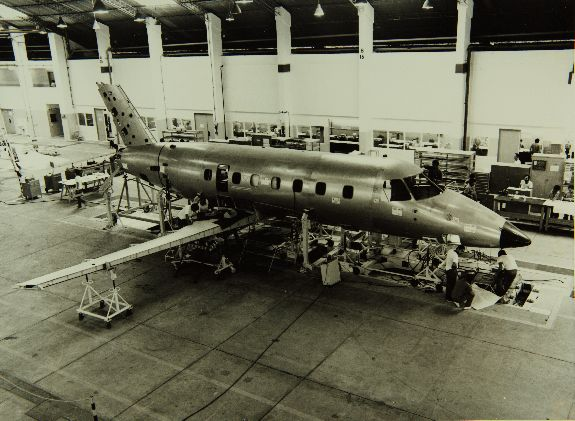
Construction of a CBA 123 prototype.

Initially, the costs and workload of the project were divided between Embraer (67%) and FMA (33%). FMA was assigned production of the wings, fins, and rudders. The original plan for the fuselage was to use a stretched version of Embraer's EMB 121 Xingu, but the cooperative decided to use a shorter version of the Brasilia. First flight was originally planned for 1988, and then customer delivery would occur in 1990. The work assignment on the Argentine side was later changed to the central fuselage, rear fuselage, and horizontal stabilizers.

In September 1987, the Garrett Engine Division of AlliedSignal was named as the CBA 123's engine supplier. The engine selected was the TPE331-16, which was soon renamed as the TPF351-20. To validate that the rear-mounted turboprop configuration was viable, Embraer performed flight tests of a Garrett TPE331-12B engine attached to the aft fuselage of a Brasilia testbed aircraft, registration number PT-ZBA, in early 1989. The tests confirmed that the engine layout resulted in lower cabin noise and vibration.

In mid-1989, the CBA 123 was branded as the "Time Machine". However, by the first quarter of 1990, the cooperative was sponsoring a competition to choose a new name for the CBA 123. The aircraft was named the "Vector" during ceremonies for its inaugural flight, which occurred on 18 July 1990 without incident. The official presentation on 30 July 1990 was attended by Brazil President Fernando Collor de Mello and Argentine President Carlos Menem. The CBA 123 now had 130 soft orders, mostly from U.S. companies. After 10 test flights and 30 flight hours, the Vector was flown from Brazil across the Atlantic Ocean to be presented at the Farnborough Air Show in early September 1990. By the fourth quarter of 1990, the aircraft had reached an estimated price of about USD5 million, which was thought to be around USD1 million more expensive than competing 19-seat turboprops. But in November 1990, Embraer began cutting nearly 4,000 jobs from its 12,800-employee workforce, while announcing a one-year delay in CBA 123 program development. By this time, Embraer expected aircraft production to start in May 1993. The second Vector prototype made its initial flight in March 1991, as the cooperative attempted to make some equipment items optional instead of standard to reduce the aircraft price. The second prototype flew at the 1991 Paris Air Show in June, by which time the aircraft had accumulated 400 hours of flight testing.

=== Program cancellation ===
Unfortunately for Embraer and FMA, the high technology which would ensure the success of the CBA 123 was one of the reasons of its demise. The final unit cost of the aircraft was too high to be absorbed by the market. Also, new investments from the Brazilian Government became unavailable due to the political crisis caused by the impeachment process and resignation of President Collor de Mello. In addition, Embraer claimed that electronics suppliers increased their prices and demanded advance payments due to Embraer's financial difficulties at the time, which caused the aircraft price to become more expensive.

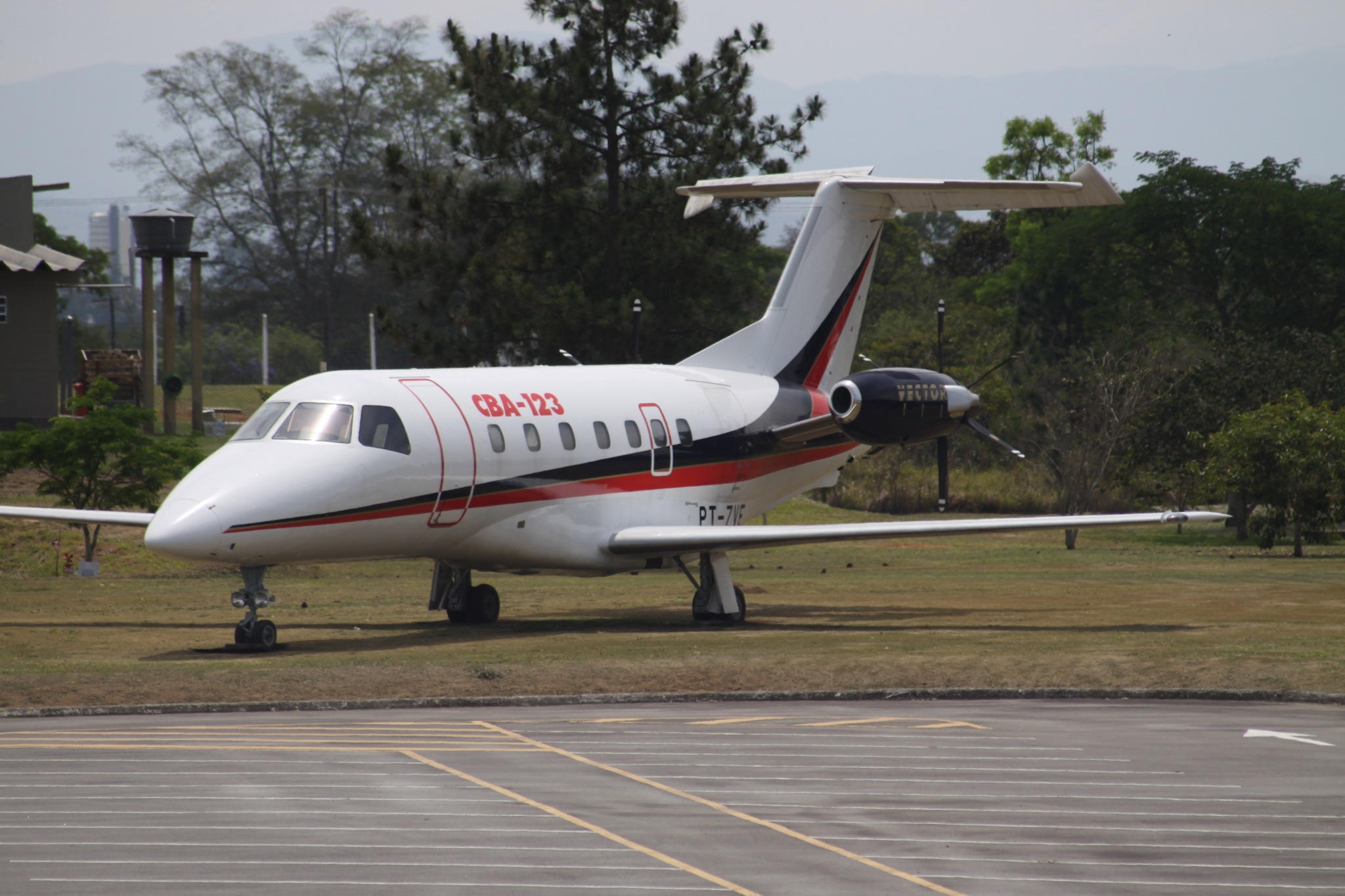
Prototype PT-ZVE on public display at São José dos Campos.

The third prototype (LV-X134), to be built by FMA, was stopped at 80% (est.) of building and now is stored in Argentina.

The CBA 123 Vector project, which cost US$300 million, was therefore cancelled, with only two prototypes built. Although a failure, the project gave Embraer maturity to work with new technologies, which led to the development of the successful Embraer ERJ 145 family of jets. Upon the return of founder Ozires Silva as Embraer's leader in 1992, he faced the choice of whether to continue with the CBA 123 or the ERJ 145. Silva initially wanted to postpone the ERJ 145 in favor of certifying the CBA 123, which was in a more advanced state of development, but the company's U.S. representatives convinced him to proceed instead with the ERJ 145 based on the regional jet segment's better market outlook. The rear-engined ERJ 145 had the same Brasilia-derived fuselage cross-section as the CBA 123, so the ERJ 145 was basically a stretch of the CBA 123 with turbofans instead of turboprops. Much of the CBA 123 development work fed into the development of the ERJ 145.

Some of these new technologies on the CBA 123 were described in the Federal Aviation Administration response to a request for certification of the aircraft: "This airplane incorporates a number of novel or unusual design features, such as digital avionics including, but not necessarily limited to, an electronic flight instrument system (EFIS), attitude and heading reference system (AHRS), engine indication and crew alerting system (EICAS), and full authority digital engine control (FADEC), which are vulnerable to lightning and high-intensity radiated fields (HIRF) external to the airplane. In addition to these novel or unusual design features, the Model CBA-123 also incorporates other unrelated novel or unusual design features. Those features will be the subject of separate notices of proposed special conditions".

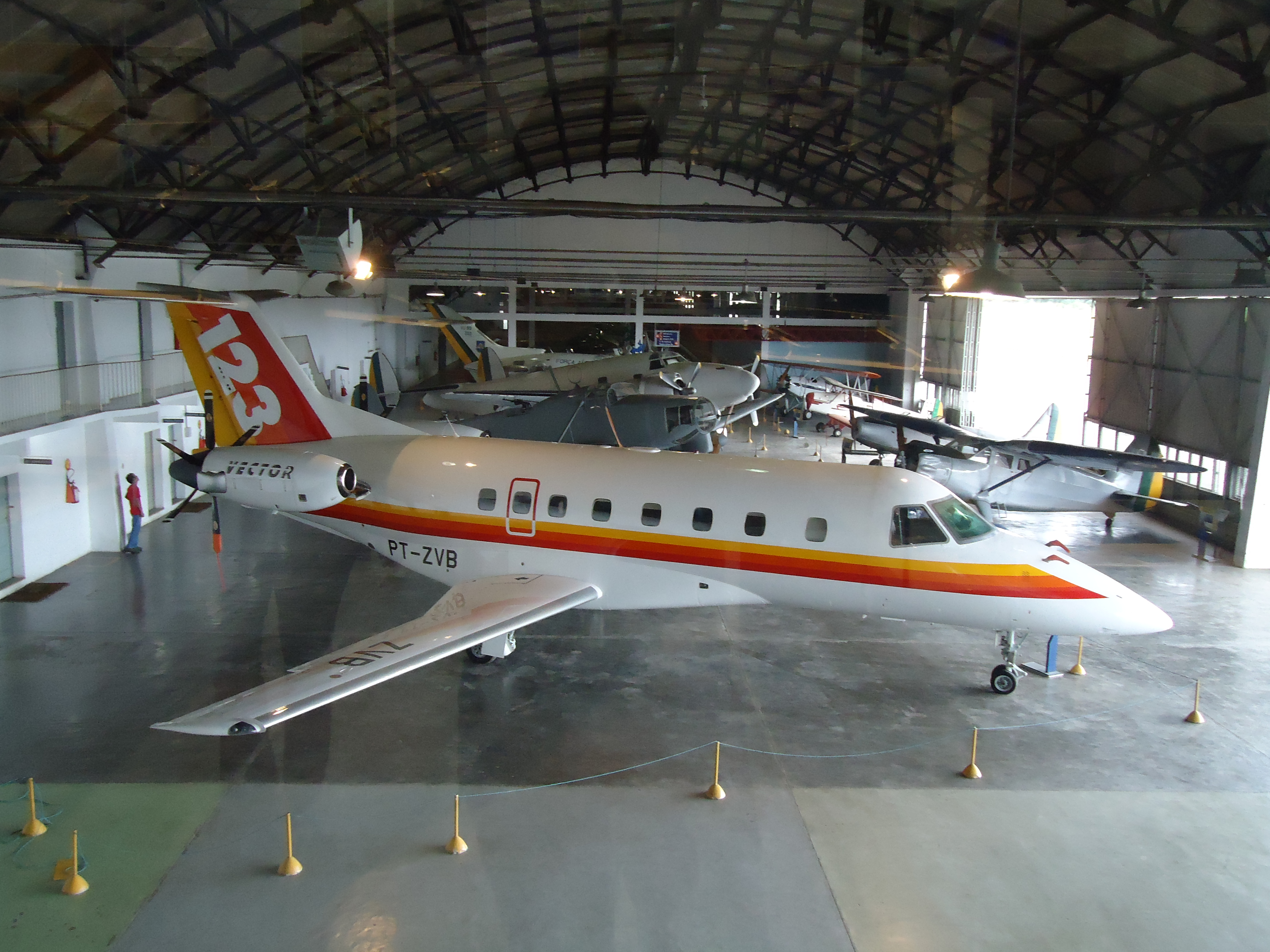
Prototype PT-ZVB in storage.

== Design ==
The aircraft was designed as a high-technology turboprop aircraft, to be fully certified under United States FAR 25. It was powered by two Garrett TPF351 turboprop engines (more powerful derivatives of Garrett's popular TPE331) mounted on pylons on the rear fuselage and driving six-bladed pusher configuration scimitar propellers, which spun on a plane of rotation that was 12 feet (3.7 m) behind the nearest row of seats. The engine location allowed a smaller wing to be used, giving a higher cruise speed, while also improving passenger comfort. Noise was estimated to be an average volume of 74–76 decibels within the cabin during cruise, and the cooperative claimed the aircraft was noticeably quieter than a Boeing 737-300. The engines used alternative gearbox modules, so the propellers could be set up to rotate in either direction to support the counter-rotating propeller configuration of the CBA 123. The initial configuration had the port propeller turning clockwise, while the starboard propeller turned counterclockwise. Rotational speed of the Hartzell HC-E6A-5 propellers was up to 1,700 rpm, and at cruise the propellers turned at 1,445 rpm. Propeller diameter was 2.59 meters (102 inches).

The aircraft design had wings with supercritical airfoils, used a FADEC system for engine control, plus EICAS and EFIS avionics systems. Fastest cruise speed was about 350–360 knots (650–670 km/h; 400–410 mph) at an altitude of around 7,600 m (25,000 ft). Most economical cruise altitude was at 9,100–10,700 m (30,000–35,000 ft).

== Aircraft on display ==
To celebrate its 40th anniversary, Embraer restored its two prototype CBA 123 aircraft and donated them to Brazilian aviation museums. The work began in early 2008 and was completed in May 2009. The aircraft are on public display at the following locations:

- First prototype (registration number PT-ZVE): Outdoor exhibit at the Brazilian Aerospace Memorial (Memorial Aeroespacial Brasileiro, or MAB) in São José dos Campos.
- Second prototype (registration number PT-ZVB): Main exhibition hall at the Museu Aeroespacial in Rio de Janeiro.

In June 2013, the uncompleted FMA-built third prototype was put on outdoor display at the School of Exact Sciences of the National University of Córdoba (UNC), in Córdoba, Argentina.

== Specifications ==
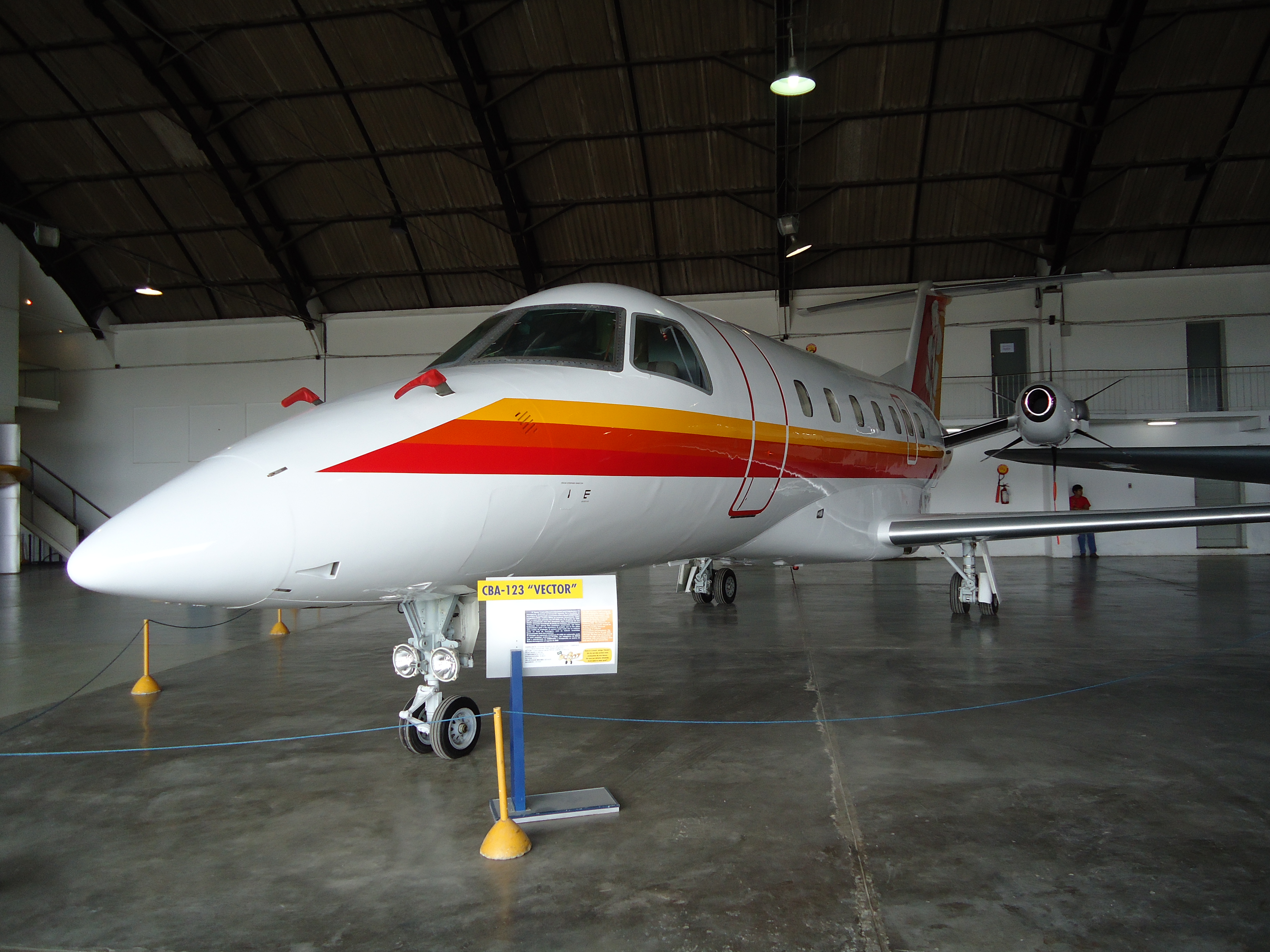
Front view of a CBA 123 Vector prototype on museum display.

Data from Jane's All The World's Aircraft 1993–94

General characteristics

- Crew: 2
- Capacity: 19 passengers
- Length: 18.09 m (59 ft 4 in)
- Wingspan: 17.72 m (58 ft 2 in)
- Height: 5.97 m (19 ft 7 in)
- Wing area: 27.2 m^{2} (293 sq ft)
- Aspect ratio: 11.5:1
- Airfoil: root EA160316, tip EA 160313
- Empty weight: 6,230 kg (13,735 lb)
- Max takeoff weight: 9,500 kg (20,944 lb)
- Fuel capacity: 2,612 L (690 US gal; 575 imp gal)
- Powerplant: 2 × Garrett TPF351-20A turboprops, 970 kW (1,300 shp) each
- Propellers: 6-bladed aluminum blade/hub Hartzell HC-E6A pusher propeller, 2.6 m (8 ft 6 in) diameter

Performance

- Maximum speed: 594 km/h (369 mph, 321 kn) at 7,315 m (24,000 ft)
- Cruise speed: 569 km/h (354 mph, 307 kn) at 9,140 m (30,000 ft)
- Stall speed: 163 km/h (101 mph, 88 kn) (flaps down, power off)
- Range: 1,852 km (1,151 mi, 1,000 nmi) (19 passengers)
- Service ceiling: 11,000 m (35,000 ft)
- Rate of climb: 11.9 m/s (2,350 ft/min) at sea level

== See also ==
- NAL Saras

Related development

- Embraer EMB 120 Brasilia
- Embraer EMB 145 Amazon

Aircraft of comparable role, configuration, and era

- Beech 1900
- British Aerospace Jetstream 31
- Fairchild Metro
- NAL Saras
