= Promavia Jet Squalus =

F.1300 Jet Squalus
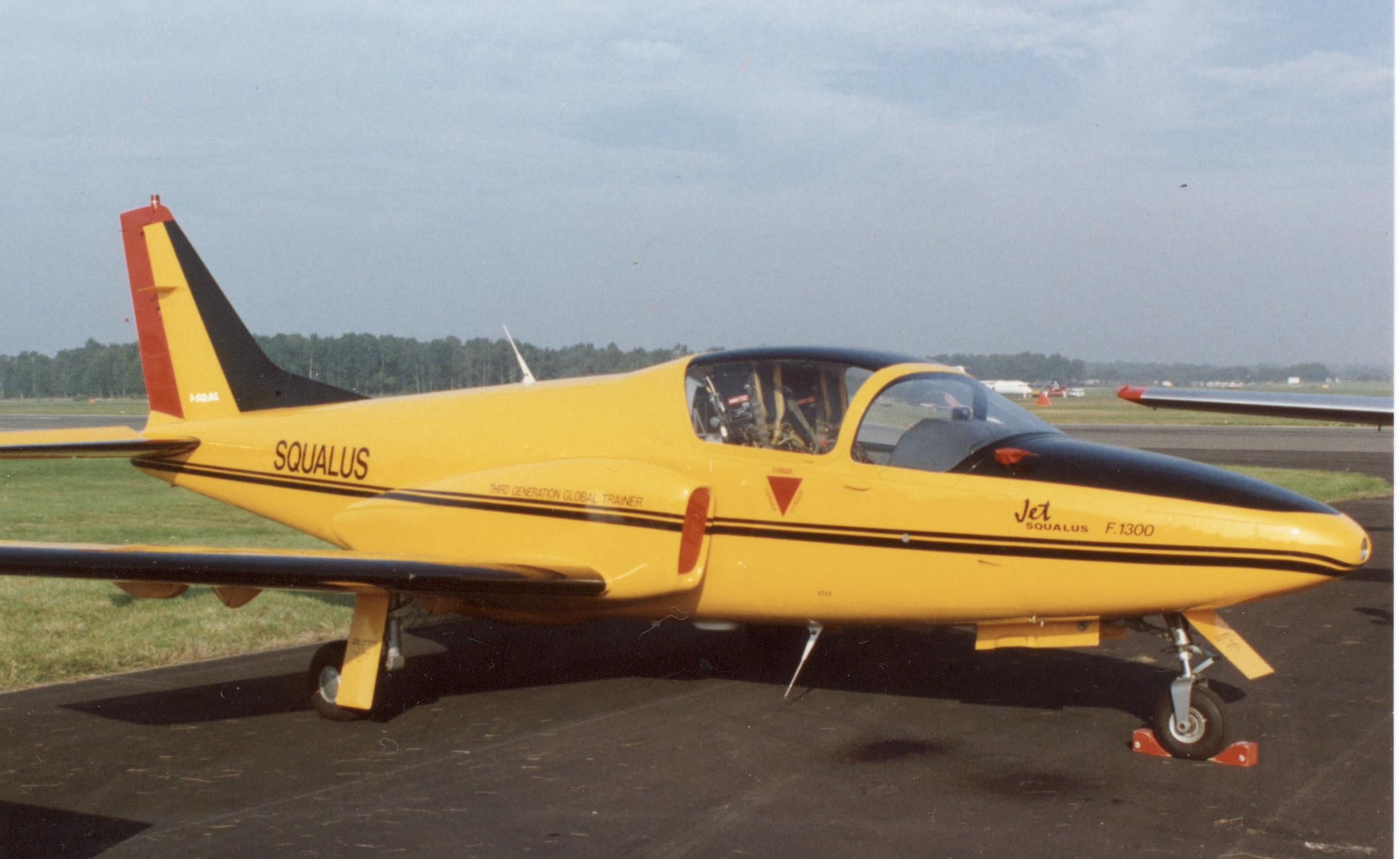
- The prototype Promavia Jet Squalus exhibited at the Farnborough Air Show in September 1988

General information
- Type: Jet Trainer
- National origin: Belgium
- Manufacturer: Promavia
- Designer: Stelio Frati
- Number built: 1

History
- First flight: 30 April 1987

The Promavia F.1300 Jet Squalus was a twin-seat light jet aircraft designed by the Italian aerospace engineer Stelio Frati and produced by Promavia in Belgium with support from the Belgian government. It was intended to be operated as a trainer aircraft in both military and civilian markets, as well as a maritime surveillance, target tow, and light attack platform.

Development commenced during the early 1980s upon Frati's concept gaining the interest of various entities within Belgium that came together to form Promavia. The firm sought to produce the Jet Squalus on a commercial basis upon the completion of development; considerable backing was provided by the Belgian government. On 30 April 1987, the first prototype made its maiden flight; it was intended to be followed by a further two prototypes before serial production would commence. In addition to the flight test programme, the first prototype was used as a public demonstrator and for evaluation purposes for prospective customers, such as the Belgian Air Force.

Various opportunities were sought out for the Jet Squalus, including the Joint Primary Aircraft Training System (JPATS) programme of the United States Air Force and United States Navy, for which the dedicated ATTA 3000 variant was proposed. Several agreements and partnerships were announced with organisations such as the Belgian flag carrier Sabena, Portugal's Oficinas Gerais de Material Aeronautico (OGMA), the Canadian province of Saskatchewan and even the Russian aircraft manufacturer Mikoyan. However, such agreements did not ultimately result in orders being secured and no production run ever took place. Only the first aircraft ever flew, a further two prototypes were believed to have been produced.

== Design and development ==
=== Background and features ===
The Jet Squalus originated in the work of the Italian aerospace engineer Stelio Frati, who designed the aircraft; it was based on his earlier lightweight jet trainers, the F.5 Trento and the F.400 Cobra. It was intended to perform various forms of training missions, including of commercial pilots, navigation and weapons training, as well as basic and advanced military pilot training; additional roles envisioned included maritime search and surveillance; border patrol; aerial reconnaissance; and target towing. Furthermore, a twin-engined model was envisioned to perform light attack and reconnaissance missions.

Early on, the Jet Squalus was envisioned as a replacement for the SIAI-Marchetti SF.260 trainer; one early prospective customer identified for the type was the Belgian Air Force. During 1983, market research for the aircraft was completed by a consortium of Belgian industrial and financial institutions. Soon thereafter, the endeavour gained the support of the Belgian Government, which provided financial backing to help produce a prototype aircraft. Additional private sponsorship was reportedly secured for the project; this led to the formation of Promavia SA by a consortium that included Aspair, SONACA, Sonegal, Prominvest, the Societe Generale and BBL banks, and two prominent Belgian industrialists.

In terms of its basic configuration, the Jet Squalus was a cantilever low-wing monoplane with a single swept vertical fin and straight horizontal stabilizers. The horizontal tail unit was equipped with elevators; a single trim tab was present on the port elevator. The primary flight control surfaces were mechanically actuated. The aircraft was furnished with tricycle landing gear that was fitted with single wheels.

The cockpit, which accommodated two personnel in a side-by-side seating arrangement, was covered by a single-piece framed canopy. It was furnished with an electronic flight instrument system (supplied by Rockwell Collins) and an oxygen generation system from Negretti. Both of the occupants were provided with Martin-Baker-supplied ejector seats.

The Jet Squalus was originally powered by a single Garrett TFE109 turbofan; air was fed to the engine via intakes located above the wing root. Alternative powerplants were subsequently explored. The aircraft was fitted with four underwing hard points that were compatible with a wide range of armaments; they could also be used to carry auxiliary fuel tanks.

=== Into flight and sales effort ===
On 30 April 1987, the first prototype, registered I-SQAL, performed its maiden flight. It was initially powered by a single Garrett TFE 109-1; it was intended to be refitted with a Garrett TFE 109-3 once this powerplant became available. During mid-1988, this prototype participated in an evaluation for the Belgian Air Force, but this did not result in an order.

A key opportunity for the aircraft was presented by the Joint Primary Aircraft Training System (JPATS) programme of the United States Air Force and United States Navy. A dedicated variant, designated as the ATTA 3000, was specifically designed to fulfil JPATS’ requirements. Furthermore, a twin-engine variant of the ATTA 3000, sometimes referred to as the ATTA 4000, was also proposed. Various powerplants, including the Williams-Rolls FJ44 turbofan engine and an unspecified in-development Pratt & Whitney turbofan, were studied to power the type. When used for tactical training, the ATTA 3000 was to carry 7.62 mm, 12.7 mm, or 20 mm gun pods, rocket launchers, infrared air-to-air missiles, or bombs.

Amid the development of the ATTA 3000, Promavia opted to collaborate with the Russian aircraft manufacturer Mikoyan; this arrangement led to the aircraft being alternatively referred to as the MiG-ATTA. However, the depth of Mikoyan's involvement in the programme was not publicly defined in detail. Following the demise of the similar American Fairchild T-46 trainer in 1986, the support for the aircraft's original engine disappeared, which motivated plans to re-engine the Jet Squalus with the Williams-Rolls FJ44 in its place.

During September 1988, the sole aircraft was exhibited at the Farnborough Air Show. Promavia was keen to explore opportunities for the Jet Squalus on the commercial market; during 1989, an agreement with the Belgian flag carrier Sabena was announced under which the airline was to acquire an undisclosed number of the aircraft. That same year, Promavia announced a production agreement with Portugal's Oficinas Gerais de Material Aeronautico (OGMA) for 100 Jet Squalus trainers, 30 of which were envisioned to be delivered to the Portuguese Air Force. However, no such order from the service was ever placed.

In August 1991, Promavia and the Canadian province of Saskatchewan’s government formed an agreement for the final assembly of the Jet Squalus in Saskatoon, which included the establishment of a pilot training academy. However, negotiations over provincial funding for the endeavour were eventually abandoned.

A second prototype was produced but is not believed to have ever been flown; it was reportedly set to be modified into a commercial pilot trainer. Work on a third prototype was also started, it was supposed to feature a pressurised cockpit. The first prototype was last reported to be stored in a hangar at Foothills Regional Airport, Alberta, Canada.

== Variants ==
F1300 NGT
The baseline jet trainer version of the Procaer Cobra lineage.
F1300 AWS-MS/SAR
Proposed Maritime surveillance/search and rescue.
F1300 AWS-R
Proposed Reconnaissance.
F1300 AWS-W
Proposed Armament trainer or Police/Border defence.
F1300 AWS-TT
Proposed Target tower.
ATTA 3000
Proposed Advanced Trainer/Tactical Aircraft for the United States JPATS program. Single- and twin-jet versions were proposed. The ATTA 3000 could have been armed with 7.62-mm or 20-mm guns, 70-mm rocket launchers, infra-red air-to-air-missiles, or bombs.
ARA 3600
Proposed Attack/Reconnaissance Aircraft powered by twin TFE109-3 turbofans and armed with 1,000 kg (2,200 lb) of external stores.

== Specifications ==
Data from Jane's All The World's Aircraft 1993–94

General characteristics

- Crew: 2
- Length: 9.36 m (30 ft 9 in)
- Wingspan: 9.04 m (29 ft 8 in)
- Height: 3.60 m (11 ft 10 in)
- Wing area: 13.58 m^{2} (146.2 sq ft)
- Aspect ratio: 6.0:1
- Empty weight: 1,300 kg (2,866 lb)
- Max takeoff weight: 2,400 kg (5,291 lb)
- Fuel capacity: 720 L (190 US gal; 160 imp gal) usable fuel
- Powerplant: 1 × Garrett TFE109-1 turbofan, 5.92 kN (1,330 lbf) thrust

Performance

- Maximum speed: 519 km/h (322 mph, 280 kn) at 14,000 ft (4,270 m)
- Cruise speed: 482 km/h (300 mph, 260 kn) (normal operating speed)
- Stall speed: 124 km/h (77 mph, 67 kn) (flaps down)
- Never exceed speed: 638 km/h (396 mph, 344 kn) (Mach 0.70)
- Ferry range: 1,850 km (1,150 mi, 1,000 nmi) at 20,000 ft (6,100 m) (Max internal fuel)
- Service ceiling: 11,275 m (36,991 ft)
- g limits: +7/-3.5
- Rate of climb: 13 m/s (2,500 ft/min)
- Takeoff distance to 15 m (50 ft): 655 metres (2,150 ft)
- Landing distance from 15 m (50 ft): 2,200 ft (671 m)

Armament

- Hardpoints: 4 with a capacity of 150 kg (330 lb) each

== See also ==
Aircraft of comparable role, configuration, and era

- Fairchild T-46
