= Frederick Dallenbach =

Frederick Dallenbach was an engineer at Garrett AiResearch, who did pioneering work in gas turbine engines for aircraft applications. He won the Wright Brothers Medal in 1949 with Homer J. Wood for a paper discussing auxiliary turbines to supply pneumatic power for aircraft based on the Garrett GTC43/44 and GTP70 units.
