= TWC Aviation =

Business aviation company with operations in California and New York state

TWC Aviation, Inc.
- Company type: Subsidiary
- Industry: Private aviation
- Founded: 1998; 28 years ago
- Founder: Andrew Lessman
- Defunct: 2015
- Fate: Acquired by Landmark Aviation
- Successor: Landmark Aviation
- Headquarters: San Jose, California, US
- Number of locations: San Jose, Los Angeles, New York
- Area served: Worldwide
- Services: Air charter; Aircraft management; Sales and acquisitions; Jet card
- Number of employees: 300
- Parent: Landmark Aviation

TWC Aviation, Inc. was an international business aviation company with operations centers at San Jose International Airport, in San Jose, California, Van Nuys Airport in Los Angeles, and Westchester County Airport, in White Plains, New York. It was a subsidiary Landmark Aviation.

== History ==
TWC Aviation was founded in Las Vegas, Nevada, in February 1998, by Andrew M. Lessman, owner of vitamin manufacturer ProCaps Laboratories. TWC Aviation began operations with a Hawker 800 business jet based at McCarran International Airport. Adding aircraft management and aircraft sales services, TWC Aviation relocated in 2001 to Bob Hope Airport in Burbank, California. The move positioned the company in the lucrative Greater Los Angeles market, serving clients throughout Southern California. In 2002, TWC Aviation acquired Corporate Aircraft Technical Services, an FAA Part 145 Repair Station. This enabled the company to offer FAA-certified aircraft maintenance and repair services. By 2008, TWC Aviation was serving charter and management clients nationwide, and had outgrown the Burbank facility. The company moved to a new custom-built operations center and hangar complex at Van Nuys Airport in Los Angeles, one of the world's busiest commercial aviation airports.

== Acquisition ==
In 2010, TWC Aviation acquired ACM Aviation Services, an aircraft management and charter company founded in 1981 by Mike Markkula, the entrepreneur and investor who helped launch Apple Computer. This acquisition effectively doubled the size of the company, and added operations centers in San Jose, California, and White Plains, New York. In April 2015 TWC was purchased by Landmark Aviation and became a wholly owned subsidiary of Landmark.

TWC Aviation has recently expanded into the increasingly affluent Asian market, particularly the Greater China Region, comprising Hong Kong, Macau, Taiwan and mainland China. In March 2012, the company announced a strategic alliance with Hong Kong-based Sino Jet Management Limited. Under the terms of the agreement, TWC Aviation is the exclusive operator for Sino Jet's charter services throughout the Asia-Pacific region, and Sino Jet is TWC Aviation's exclusive marketing agent in Asia.

Sino Jet fleet
Aircraft	In service	Orders	Passengers	Notes
Airbus ACJ319neo	1	—	VIP	
Boeing 737-700BBJ	1	—	VIP	
Embraer Legacy 650	3	—	VIP	
Total	5	—		

TWC Aviation ranked 3,668 on the 2011 “Inc. 5000” list of America's fastest growing companies (Inc. Magazine, August 2011), and was named the 35th Fastest Growing Private Company in Los Angeles by the Los Angeles Business Journal (November 2011). In 2011, TWC Aviation earned an NBAA Commercial Business Flying Safety Award from the National Business Aviation Association for 26,838 accident-free hours over 11 years.
