= Cliff Garrett =

American aerospace engineer

- Born: March 8, 1908; Seattle, Washington
- Died: June 22, 1963 (aged 55)

John Clifford Garrett (1908 in Seattle, Washington - 1963) was an American entrepreneur who (after studying engineering at UCLA) founded a company in Los Angeles in 1936 which came to be known as Garrett AiResearch. The company was first named Aircraft Tool and Supply Company, then by early 1937 was renamed as Garrett Supply Company, and by 1939, AiResearch and shortly thereafter AiResearch Manufacturing Company, which then became a division within the Garrett Corporation.

By the end of the 1940s Garrett Corporation was listed on the New York Stock Exchange. "In the late 1940s and early 1950s, Garrett was heavily committed to the design of small gas turbine engines from 20 - 90 horse power (15 - 67 kW). The engineers had developed a good background in the metallurgy of housings, high speed seals, radial inflow turbines, and centrifugal compressors."

In the 1950s and 1960s, Garrett's company diversified and expanded. Garrett AiResearch designed and produced a wide range of military and industrial products for aerospace and general industry.

Cliff Garrett died in 1963. In 1964, to avoid a hostile takeover of Garrett's assets by Curtiss-Wright, his corporation merged with Signal Oil and Gas. In 1968, Signal Oil and Gas renamed itself to The Signal Companies.

== Other ==
- Since 1984 the Society of Automotive Engineers (SAE) has given an annual Cliff Garrett Turbomachinery and Applications Engineering Award, which "honors Cliff Garrett and the inspiration he provided to engineers by his example, support, encouragement, and many contributions as an aerospace pioneer. To perpetuate recognition of Mr. Garrett's achievements and dedication as an aerospace pioneer, SAE administers an annual lecture by a distinguished authority in the engineering of turbomachinery for on-highway, off-highway, and/or spacecraft and aircraft uses".
- Cliff Garrett was installed in the Arizona Aviation Hall of Fame in 1994.
- The Cliff Garrett Memorial Rodeo Association sponsors an annual charity rodeo, in which Honeywell's Phoenix employees compete in rodeo events.
- The Garrett name is still used to describe turbochargers produced and sold by Honeywell, and Garrett is a registered trademark.
