= Homer J. Wood =

Homer J. Wood is an American aerospace engineer. He was an engineer at Garrett AiResearch, who did pioneering work in gas turbine engines for aircraft applications. He won the Wright Brothers Medal in 1949 with Frederick Dallenbach for a paper discussing auxiliary turbines to supply pneumatic power for aircraft based on the Garrett GTC43/44 and GTP70 units. Wood went on to design the GTC85, one of the most widely used auxiliary power units in commercial and military aviation.

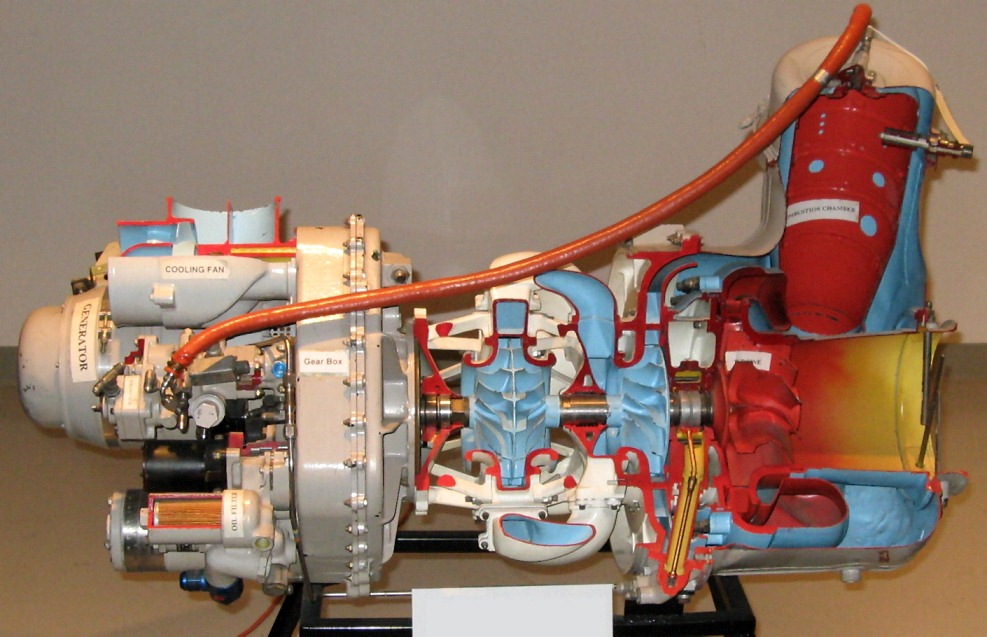
Garrett AiResearch GTC85 auxiliary power unit
