= Landmark Aviation =

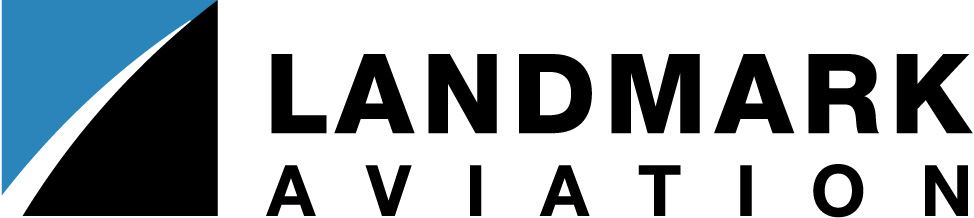
Landmark Aviation logo

Landmark Aviation is an aviation services company that offers a wide variety of services at MRO repair centers, at FBOs in the United States and Canada and within its aircraft sales, charter and management business. The company also operates Associated Air Center, a transport completion center.

Landmark Aviation is derived from a company called "Garrett/Piedmont Hawthorne/Associated" which operated for about a year before being rebranded in October 2005. Garrett/Piedmont Hawthorne/Associated was in turn created from the merger of three companies (Garrett Aviation, Piedmont Hawthorne, and Associated Air) which were all owned by the Carlyle Group.

In 2007, Landmark was merged with two other entities, and took the name StandardAero from one of those. Like Landmark, StandardAero is owned by Dubai Aerospace Enterprise.

In March, 2008, an acquisition of the company was completed by Encore FBO, GTCR Golder Rauner and Platform Partners from Dubai Aerospace.

In September 2012, the company was acquired by The Carlyle Group, with Landmark now having 51 locations.

In December 2012, the company acquired First Aviation at Teterboro Airport (TEB).

In April 2014, Landmark purchased RSS Jet Centre, adding 3 FBOs in the United Kingdom and Ross Aviation, a network of 20 FBOs in the Continental United States and Hawaii, expanding its total holdings to 60 locations in the US and 76 total worldwide. The Ross Aviation purchase closed in August of the same year.

In February 2015, Landmark added 2 new FBO locations at Key West International Airport, FL (EYW) and at Houston Ellington Airport (Texas), TX (EFD).

In May 2015, Landmark purchased the assets of Era FBO and began operating the former Million Air FBO at Anchorage Ted Stevens International Airport, AK (ANC). It also acquired TWC Aviation.

In February 2016, BBA Aviation (competitor Signature Flight Support's parent company) acquired Landmark Aviation's 195 global locations including FBOs, MROs and its charter/management division for $2.065 billion. The terms of the acquisition required the divestment of six co-located FBO locations.

In July 2016, Ross Aviation (the same Ross Aviation that sold their locations to Landmark 2 years prior) purchased the 6 divested FBO locations from BBA Aviation for an undisclosed amount.
