= Garrett AiResearch =

Former American manufacturer of aircraft engines

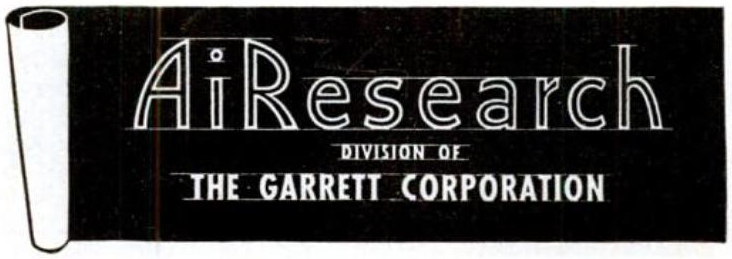
- Industry: Aerospace
- Founded: 1936
- Founder: John Clifford "Cliff" Garrett
- Fate: Merged to Signal Companies in 1964, Allied Signal in 1985, now part of Honeywell Aerospace; Garrett Aviation merged to Landmark Aviation in 2004.
- Successor: AlliedSignal
- Headquarters: Los Angeles, California, United States
- Key people: Frederick Dallenbach; Homer J. Wood

Garrett AiResearch was a manufacturer of turboprop engines and turbochargers, and a pioneer in numerous aerospace technologies. It was previously known as Aircraft Tool and Supply Company, Garrett Supply Company, AiResearch Manufacturing Company, or simply AiResearch. In 1964, Garrett AiResearch merged with Signal Oil & Gas, to form a company renamed in 1968 to Signal Companies. In 1985, it merged with Allied Corporation, forming AlliedSignal. In 1999 AlliedSignal acquired Honeywell and adopted the Honeywell name.

== Founding years ==
John Clifford "Cliff" Garrett founded a company in Los Angeles in 1936 which came to be known as Garrett AiResearch or simply AiResearch. The company was first named Aircraft Tool and Supply Company. In early 1937, it was renamed as Garrett Supply Company. In 1939, it became AiResearch and shortly thereafter AiResearch Manufacturing Company, which then became a division within the Garrett Corporation. Already operating his Garrett Supply and Airsupply businesses, in 1939 Cliff Garrett established a small research laboratory to conduct "air research" on the development of pressurized flight for passenger aircraft. "[AiResearch's] first 'lab' was a small store building on Melrose Avenue in Los Angeles".

In 1939, Garrett incorporated the "Garrett Corporation" and the three operating companies became divisions: Airsupply Division, Garrett Supply Division, and AiResearch Manufacturing Division. Needing additional space, they built their own manufacturing facility in Glendale, California, and thereby established the name AiResearch Manufacturing Company. By 1941, AiResearch needed new space, and on April 28, 1941, moved from Glendale to what until then had been a beanfield on Sepulveda Boulevard, at the corner of Century Boulevard near Mines Field, which later became Los Angeles Airport.

In 1942, the Army Air Force concluded that vital cabin pressurization manufacturing facilities should be relocated inland from the coast, and AiResearch set up the AiResearch Phoenix Division in Phoenix, Arizona. For this purpose, AiResearch Manufacturing Company of Arizona was established as a wholly owned subsidiary.

== History ==
=== 1939 through 1949 ===
The company's first major product was an oil cooler for military aircraft. Garrett designed and produced oil coolers for the Douglas DB-7. Boeing's B-17 bombers, credited with substantially tipping the air war in America's and Great Britain's favor over Europe and the Pacific, were outfitted with Garrett intercoolers, as was the B-25. The company developed and produced the cabin pressure system for the B-29 bomber, the first production bomber pressurized for high altitude flying. By the end of World War II, AiResearch engineers had developed air expansion cooling turbines for America's first jet aircraft, the Lockheed P-80 Shooting Star. During World War II, Garrett AiResearch sold $112 million in military equipment and had as many as 5,000 employees.

Having to scale back its workforce to just 600 employees at the end of the war stimulated Garrett to look for new revenue sources. "He found them in the small turbines which Patent Engineer Walter Ramsaur had been perfecting since 1943. A way had to be found to cool cockpits so jet pilots could endure the heat generated by air friction at supersonic speeds. Ramsaur's turbine provided the answer. By putting an engine's heat to work turning the turbine, it cooled the air by expanding it, then injected the air into the cockpit. As rearmament got under way, Garrett began turning out a total of 700 accessory products. With the Navy order for [an on-board engine] self-starter, [by 1951] Garrett Corp. [had] a $120 million backlog, enough to keep 5,500 workers on three shifts busy for at least the next three years".

By the end of the 1940s, Garrett Corporation was listed on the New York Stock Exchange. "In the late 1940s and early 1950s, Garrett was heavily committed to the design of small gas turbine engines from 20 - 90 horse power (15 - 67 kW). The engineers had developed a good background in the metallurgy of housings, high speed seals, radial inflow turbines, and centrifugal compressors".

=== 1950s and 1960s ===
By 1949, the Sepulveda Blvd. property was increasingly constrained by the demand for development of commercial space near the fast-growing Los Angeles International Airport (LAX). At that time, 2,000 people worked at the facility "and Garrett was ranked one of the top three aircraft accessory manufacturers in the world". In 1959 ground was broken for construction of an additional facility at 190th Street and Crenshaw Boulevard in Torrance, California. Part of that facility was occupied in 1960. "By 1962, 1000 employees were working at the Torrance location and by 1972, 3000 employees were based there". After a gradual series of moves, the Sepulveda facility was closed in 1990.

During the 1950s, AiResearch initiated activities in the field of aircraft electronics, "first with an angle of attack computer 1968-1970, to eliminate gunfire error and then with its first delivery of a complete centralized air data system". In the 1950s and 1960s Garrett diversified and expanded. Garrett AiResearch designed and produced a wide range of military and industrial products for aerospace and general industry. It focused on fluid controls and hydraulics, avionics, turbochargers, aircraft engines, and environmental control systems for aircraft and spacecraft. "By 1960 Garrett gas turbines, cabin pressurization systems, air conditioners, and flight control systems were aboard the Convair 880, Lockheed Super Constellation, Vickers Viscount, Sud Aviation Caravelle, Douglas DC-8, and Boeing 707. The company had also developed the first inflatable airliner evacuation slides".

In the 1950s and 1960s, Garrett pioneered the development of foil bearings, which were first installed as original equipment on the McDonnell-Douglas DC-10 in 1969 and then became standard equipment on all U.S. military aircraft. In the 1960s, AiResearch Environmental Control Systems provided the life supporting atmosphere for American astronauts in the projects Mercury, Gemini, Apollo, and Skylab.

On the industrial side, the first T-15 turbocharger was delivered to the Caterpillar Company in 1955. It was followed by an order for 5,000 production units, to be installed in the Caterpillar D9 tractor. "On September 27, 1954, Cliff Garrett made the decision to separate the turbocharger group from the gas turbine department due to commercial diesel turbocharger opportunities. That was the beginning of the new AiResearch Industrial Division for turbocharger design and manufacturing". This new division was established in Phoenix, Arizona. AiResearch Industrial Division ("AID") would later be renamed Garrett Automotive.

Following the first phase of the Caterpillar project, Garrett turbochargers saw wider use on earth-moving equipment, in tractors, stationary powerplants, railroad locomotives and ships. The Garrett T11 automotive turbocharger came into being in 1960 and promptly became popular with diesel truck operators.

By 1962, Garrett was powering the world’s first turbocharged production non-sports car, the Oldsmobile Jetfire Rocket. This was followed by several other firsts, including the first turbocharged car to win the Indianapolis 500 (1968), the first turbo for a hot hatchback car application (1977-Saab 99), the first mass production turbo for diesel engines (1978-Mercedes 300SD), and the first turbo to win the 24 Hours of Le Mans (1978-Renault Alpine A442)".

=== 1970s ===
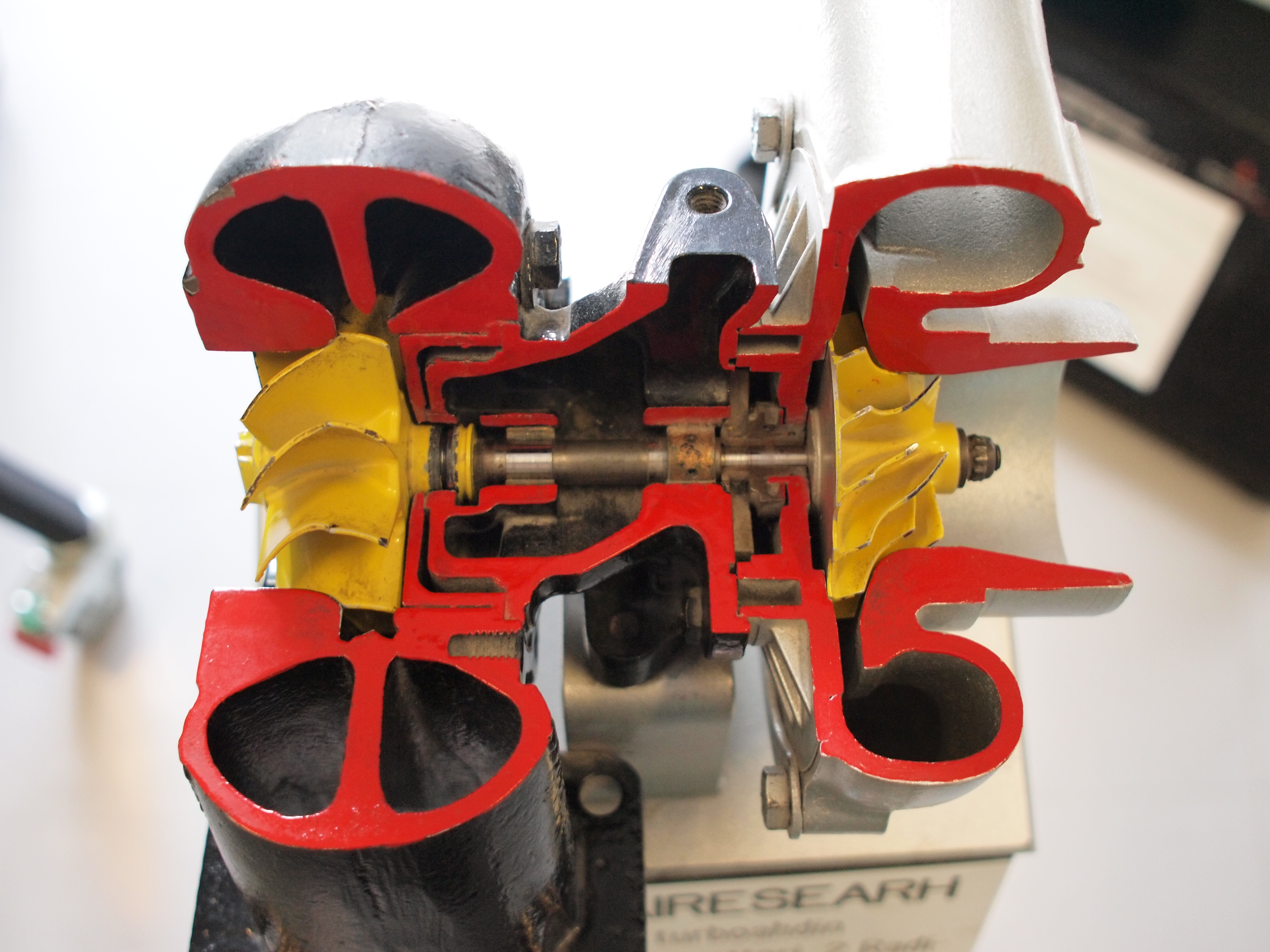
A Garrett AiResearch turbocharger from a Valmet tractor sectioned for educational purposes

In the 1970s, Garrett's expanding industrial and other non-military applications had changed the basic sources of income. "At the start of the decade sales to the military accounted for 70 percent of the company's business. At the end of the ten years, largely because of turbochargers and general aviation products, the situation was reversed. Commercial sales made up 70 percent; military had dropped to 30 percent". By the end of the 1970s "sales had reached $1.3 billion; backlog was $1.9 billion".

== Mergers ==
To avoid a hostile takeover of Garrett's assets by Curtiss-Wright following Cliff Garrett's death in 1963, Garrett Corporation merged with the Signal Oil and Gas Company in 1964. In 1968, the combined company adopted The Signal Companies as its corporate name.

In 1985, Signal merged with Allied Corp., becoming Allied-Signal. The company acquired Honeywell Aerospace in 1999. Although AlliedSignal was much larger than Honeywell, it was decided to adopt the Honeywell name because of its greater public recognition.

Part of the original Garrett AiResearch became known as the Garrett Turbine Engine Company from 1979, and became the Garrett Engine Division of AlliedSignal in 1985. In 1994, AlliedSignal acquired the Lycoming Turbine Engine Division of Textron, merging it with Garrett Engine to become the AlliedSignal Engines Division of AlliedSignal Aerospace Company.

Another part of Garrett AiResearch, The Garrett Aviation Division ("Garrett Aviation"), which mainly services aircraft, was sold to General Electric in 1997. It was renamed Landmark Aviation after a 2004 merger. In 2007, it became StandardAero after a merger, and was owned by Dubai Aerospace Enterprise. In 2015, it was purchased by BBA Aviation.

== Products ==
=== Aircraft ===
- Garrett STAMP

=== Engines ===
==== Turboprops ====
- Garrett TPE331
- Garrett TPF351

==== Turbofans ====
- CFE CFE738
- Garrett ATF3
- Garrett F109
- Garrett/ITEC F124/TFE1042
- Garrett/ITEC F125
- Garrett TFE731

== See also ==
- Central Air Data Computer
- Normalair Garrett Limited (NGL)
