= Honeywell TPE331 =

Turboprop aircraft engine

TPE331 / T76
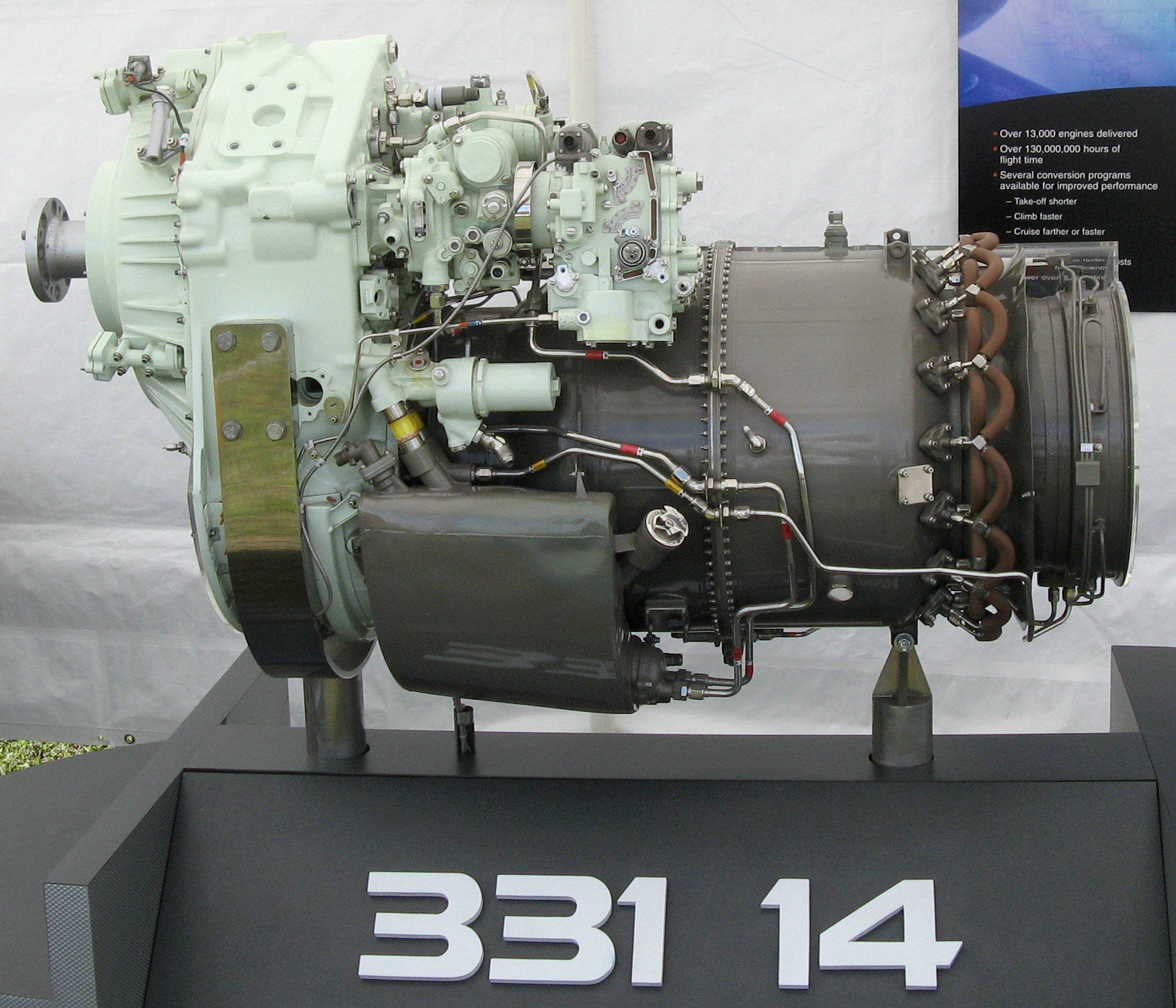
- TPE331-14
- Type: Turboprop
- National origin: United States
- Manufacturer: Garrett AiResearch; Honeywell Aerospace
- First run: 1960
- Major applications: Fairchild Swearingen Metroliner; Mitsubishi MU-2; Rockwell Turbo Commander; CASA C-212 Aviocar
- Number built: 13,500+
- Developed into: Garrett TPF351

The Honeywell TPE331 (military designation: T76) is a turboprop engine. It was designed in the 1950s by Garrett AiResearch and has been produced since 1999 by its successor, Honeywell Aerospace. The engine's power output ranges from 575 to 1,650 shaft horsepower (429 to 1,230 kW).

== Design and development ==
Garrett AiResearch began developing the TPE331 in 1959 for the military. "Designed as a 575-horsepower engine it was not a scaled-down version of a larger engine, as competitors were offering." The TPE331 originated in 1961 as a gas turbine (the "331") to power helicopters. It first went into production in 1963. By the end of 1973, more than 700 units had been shipped. It was designed to be both a turboshaft (TSE331) and a turboprop (TPE331), but the turboshaft version never went into production. The first engine was produced in 1963, installed on the Aero Commander in 1964, and put into production on the Aero Commander Turbo Commander in June 1965.

== Performance ==
The 715 shp TPE331-6 used in the Beechcraft King Air B100 has a 400-hr fuel nozzle cleaning interval, 1,800-hr hot section inspection interval, and a 5,400-hr time between overhaul; approval is possible for 3,000-hr HSIs and 6,000-hr overhauls, and engine reserves are cheaper than for the PT6A.

== Variants ==
=== Military variants (T76) ===
T76-G-2
T76-G-4
T76-G-6
T76-G-8
T76-G-10
T76-G-12
T76-G-12A
T76-G-14
T76-G-16
T76-G-410
T76-G-411
T76-G-416
T76-G-417
T76-G-418
T76-G-419
T76-G-420
T76-G-421

=== Commercial variants (TPE331) ===
US FAA TC Variants
| Model | Certified (Note: Dates from FAA type certificates E4WE (TPE331 model series 3, 5, 6, 8, 9, 10, 11, and 12) and E18NE (series 14 and 15). No certification date information available from type certificates E3WE (series 1 and 2) and E2WE (series 25, 29, 43, 45, 47, 51, 55, 57, and 61).) |
|---|---|
| TPE331-1 | 1967-12 |
| TPE331-1U | |
| TPE331-1UA | |
| TPE331-2 | 1967-12 |
| TPE331-2U | |
| TPE331-2UA | |
| TPE331-3 | 1969-03-28 |
| TPE331-3U | 1969-03-28 |
| TPE331-3UW | 1969-03-28 |
| TPE331-3W | 1969-03-28 |
| TPE331-5 (Note: Powered the Rockwell Aero Commander Turbo Commander 690, CASA 212-100, Mitsubishi MU-2N, and Dornier 228.) | 1970-05-15 |
| TPE331-5A | 1988-05-04 |
| TPE331-5AB | 1992-07-21 |
| TPE331-5B | 1992-07-21 |
| TPE331-5U | 1970-05-15 |
| TPE331-6 (Note: Powered the Mitsubishi MU-2S/K/L/M and Beech B-100.) | 1970-05-15 |
| TPE331-6A | 1978-01-20 |
| TPE331-6U | 1970-05-15 |
| TPE331-8 (Note: Powered the Cessna Conquest 441.) | 1976-11-19 |
| TPE331-8A | 1981-12-24 |
| TPE331-9 | 1976-11-19 |
| TPE331-9U | 1976-11-19 |
| TPE331-10 | 1978-01-20 |
| TPE331-10A | 1980-12-12 |
| TPE331-10AV | 1996-07-19 |
| TPE331-10B | 1980-12-12 |
| TPE331-10G | 1984-08-14 |
| TPE331-10GP | 1994-12-14 |
| TPE331-10GR | 1984-08-14 |
| TPE331-10GT | 1994-12-14 |
| TPE331-10J | 1988-05-04 |
| TPE331-10N | 1992-02-06 |
| TPE331-10P | 1994-12-14 |
| TPE331-10R | 1982-06-25 |
| TPE331-10T | 1994-04-14 |
| TPE331-10U | 1978-01-20 |
| TPE331-10UA | 1982-07-29 |
| TPE331-10UF | 1982-06-25 |
| TPE331-10UG | 1984-08-14 |
| TPE331-10UGR | 1984-08-14 |
| TPE331-10UJ | 1988-05-04 |
| TPE331-10UK | 1988-11-04 |
| TPE331-10UR | 1983-11-14 |
| TPE331-11U | 1979-09-28 |
| TPE331-11UA | 1982-06-25 |
| TPE331-12 | 1984-12-19 |
| TPE331-12B (Note: Powered the Shorts Tucano and the HAL HTT-40 trainer aircraft as well as the CASA 212-400 regional airliner) | 1986-12-10 |
| TPE331-12JR | 1997-10-31 |
| TPE331-12UA | 1988-05-04 |
| TPE331-12UAN | 2014-05-09 |
| TPE331-12UAR | 1987-12-18 |
| TPE331-12UER | 1991-07-22 |
| TPE331-12UHR | 1993-01-07 |
| TSE331-3U (Note: Used on the Sikorsky S-55 military helicopter.) | 1970-04-30 |
| TPE331-14A | 1984-04-26 |
| TPE331-14B | 1984-04-26 |
| TPE331-14F | 1989-05-24 |
| TPE331-14GR | 1992-07-13 |
| TPE331-14HR | 1992-07-13 |
| TPE331-15AW | 1988-12-05 |
| TPE331-16 (Note: Renamed to TPF351-20 in early 1988. Was the rear-fuselage powerplant for the Embraer/FMA CBA 123 Vector. Flown on a Boeing 720 testbed aircraft and Vector prototype starting in July 1990. Development of the aircraft and engine was suspended in 1992, when the engine was nine months from certification.) | N/A |
| TPE331-25A | |
| TPE331-25AA | |
| TPE331-25AB | |
| TPE331-25B | |
| TPE331-25C | |
| TPE331-25D | |
| TPE331-25DA | |
| TPE331-25DB | |
| TPE331-25E | |
| TPE331-25F | |
| TPE331-25FA | |
| TPE331-29A | |
| TPE331-43 | |
| TPE331-43-A | |
| TPE331-43-B | |
| TPE331-45 | |
| TPE331-47 (Note: Entered service on the Volpar Super Turbo 18 in February 1966.) | |
| TPE331-47-A | |
| TPE331-47-B | |
| TPE331-51 | |
| TPE331-55 | |
| TPE331-55-A | |
| TPE331-55-B | |
| TPE331-57 | |
| TPE331-57-B | |
| TPE331-61 | |
| TPE331-61-A | |

== Applications ==
- Aero/Rockwell Turbo Commander 680/690/840/980/1000
- Antonov An-38
- Ayres Thrush
- BAe Jetstream 31/32
- British Aerospace Jetstream 41
- Beech B100 King Air
- CASA C-212 Aviocar
- Cessna 441 Conquest II
- Comp Air 9
- Conroy Stolifter
- Dornier 228
- Fairchild Swearingen Metroliner
- General Atomics MQ-9 Reaper
- Grob G 520
- HAL HTT-40
- Kestrel K-350
- Mitsubishi MU-2
- North American Rockwell OV-10 Bronco
- Pilatus/Fairchild PC-6C Turbo-Porter
- Piper Cheyenne 400
- Short SC.7 Skyvan
- Short Tucano (EMB-312S Tucano)
- Swearingen Merlin

=== Fitted with TPE-331s as a replacement for their original engines ===
- Beechcraft Model 18
- Cessna 208 Caravan
- Cessna 337 Skymaster
- de Havilland Canada DHC-2 Beaver
- de Havilland Canada DHC-3 Otter
- de Havilland DH.104 Dove
- FMA IA 58 Pucará
- Grumman Ag Cat
- Grumman S-2 Tracker
- Marsh S-2F3AT Turbo Tracker
- Handley Page Jetstream
- PAC Fletcher
- SibNIA TVS-2MS (Antonov An-2 conversion)
- Sikorsky H-19 Chickasaw

== Specifications ==
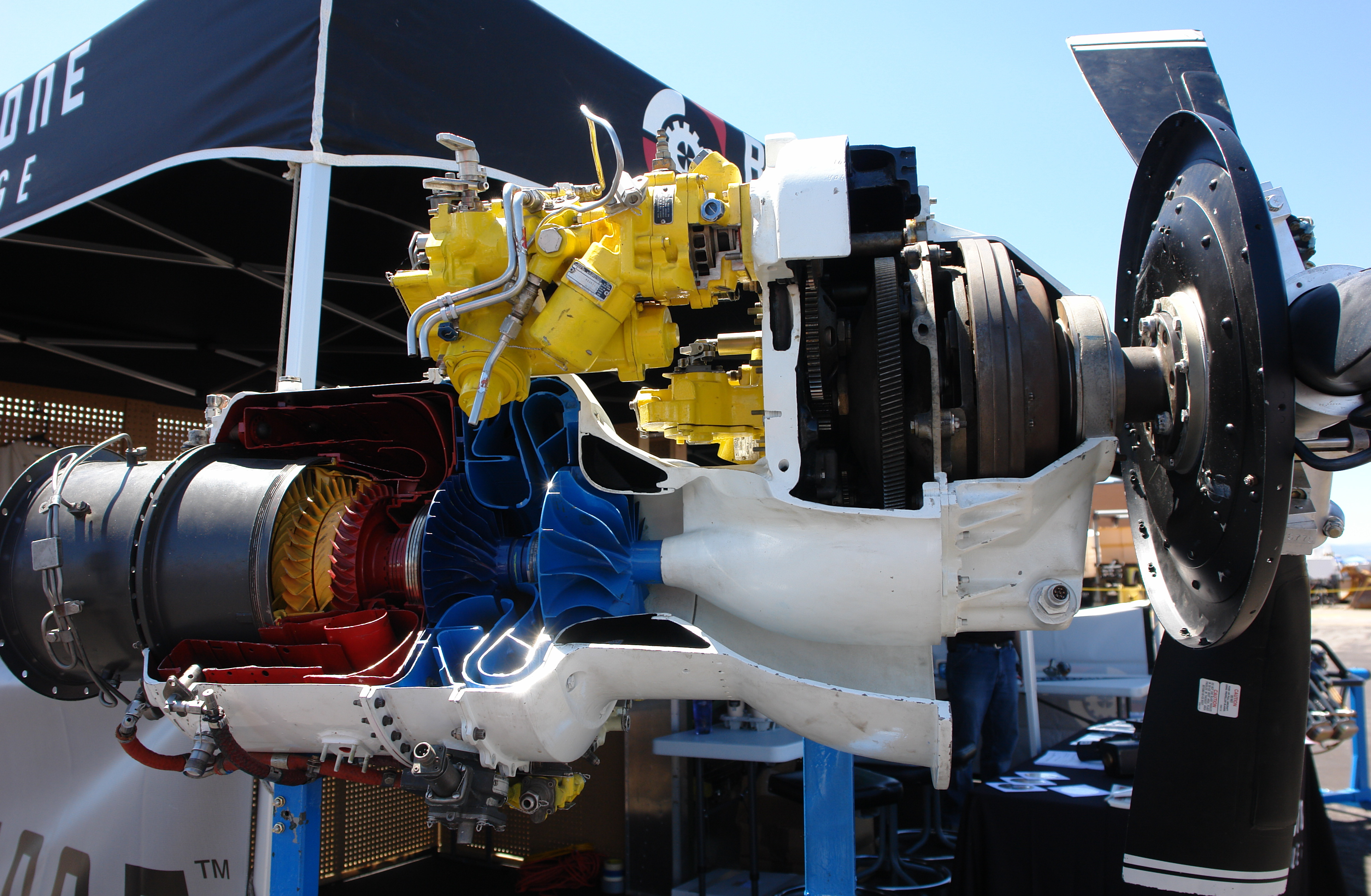
Cutaway view of a TPE-331

==== General characteristics ====
- Type: Single-shaft turboprop with integral gearbox
- Length: 46 inches (1,200 mm) (TPE331-43A), 42.82 in (1,088 mm) (TPE331-10)
- Diameter: 21 inches (530 mm) (TPE331-43A)
- Dry weight: 336 lb (152 kg) (TPE331-43A), 385 lb (175 kg) (TPE331-10)

==== Components ====
- Compressor: Two-stage centrifugal
- Combustors: Reverse annular
- Turbine: Three-stage axial
- Fuel type: Jet A, Jet B, Jet A-1, JP-8, JP-1, JP-4, JP-5, JP8+100

==== Performance ====
- Maximum power output: 575 hp (429 kW) (TPE331-43A), 940 hp (700 kW) (TPE331-10)
- Overall pressure ratio: 10.55:1 (TPE331-10)
- Specific fuel consumption: 0.534 lb/(hp⋅h) (325 g/kWh) (TPE331-10)
- Power-to-weight ratio: 1.71 hp/lb (2.81 kW/kg) (TPE331-43A), 2.44 hp/lb (4.01 kW/kg) (TPE331-10)

== See also ==
Comparable engines

- General Electric Catalyst
- Pratt & Whitney Canada PT6
- Walter M601

Related lists

- List of aircraft engines

== Bibliography ==
- Leyes, Richard A., II; Fleming, William A. (1999). The history of North American small gas turbine aircraft engines. Reston, VA: National Air and Space Museum and American Institute of Aeronautics and Astronautics (AIAA). pp. 632–661. ISBN 1-56347-332-1. OCLC 247550535.
- McClellan, J. Mac (July 1983). "Turboprop progress: Garrett stakes its fortune on engines that offer reliability with minimum maintenance". Flying. Vol. 110, no. 7. pp. 31–32. ISSN 0015-4806.
- Frignac, J-P.; Privoznik, E. J. (March 12–15, 1979). The growth and evolution of the TPE331. Gas Turbine Conference & Exhibit & Solar Energy Conference. doi:10.1115/79-GT-164. ISBN 978-0-7918-7968-9. OCLC 8518974705.
