= Garrett F109 =

Turbofan engine by Garrett AiResearch

F109 / TFE109
- Type: Turbofan
- National origin: United States
- Manufacturer: Garrett AiResearch
- First run: 1980s
- Major applications: Fairchild T-46
- Developed into: LHTEC T800

The Garrett F109 (Company designation TFE109) was a small turbofan engine developed for the Fairchild T-46 by Garrett AiResearch. With the United States Air Force's cancellation of the T-46 program in 1986, further development of the engine ceased, and with it the civil TFE109 version.

== Variants ==
ATE109
The Advanced Technology Engine (ATE) turboshaft, which was built jointly with Allison for the Light Helicopter Experimental (LHX) powerplant program and included the F109 power section.
TSE109
A turboshaft demonstrator in the 1,200 shaft horsepower (890 kilowatts) power class that first ran on August 2, 1984.
TFE109
The civil version of the F109.
F109-GA-100
The full military designation for the TFE109 turbofan.

== Applications ==
- Fairchild T-46
- Promavia Jet Squalus

== Specifications ==
==== General characteristics ====
- Type: Turbofan
- Length: 942 mm (37.1 in)
- Diameter: 523 mm (20.6 in)
- Dry weight: 182 kg (400 lb)

==== Components ====
- Compressor: Dual high pressure centrifugal, driven off high pressure turbine.
- Combustors: Annular
- Fuel type: JET A

==== Performance ====
- Maximum thrust: (Max takeoff) 5.92 kN (1,330 lb st), (max continuous at 9,145 M/30,000 ft at Mach 0.5) 1.78 kN (400 lb st)
- Specific fuel consumption: (At max takeoff) 11.10 mg/Ns (0.392 lb/hr/lb st)
- Thrust-to-weight ratio: 3.33 (max takeoff), 1 (max continuous at 30,000 feet (9,100 m) at Mach 0.5)

== See also ==
Related development

- Garrett TPE331
- LHTEC T800

Comparable engines

- Williams FJ33
- Williams FJ44

Related lists

- List of aircraft engines
