= Negretti =

Negretti is a surname. Notable people with the surname include:

- Ettore Negretti (1883–after 1902), Italian footballer
- Giovanna Negretti, American activist
- Henry Negretti (1818–1879) of the firm Negretti and Zambra
- Jacopo Negretti (1480–1528) known as Palma Vecchio, Italian painter
