= Fairchild T-46 =

American light jet trainer aircraft

T-46
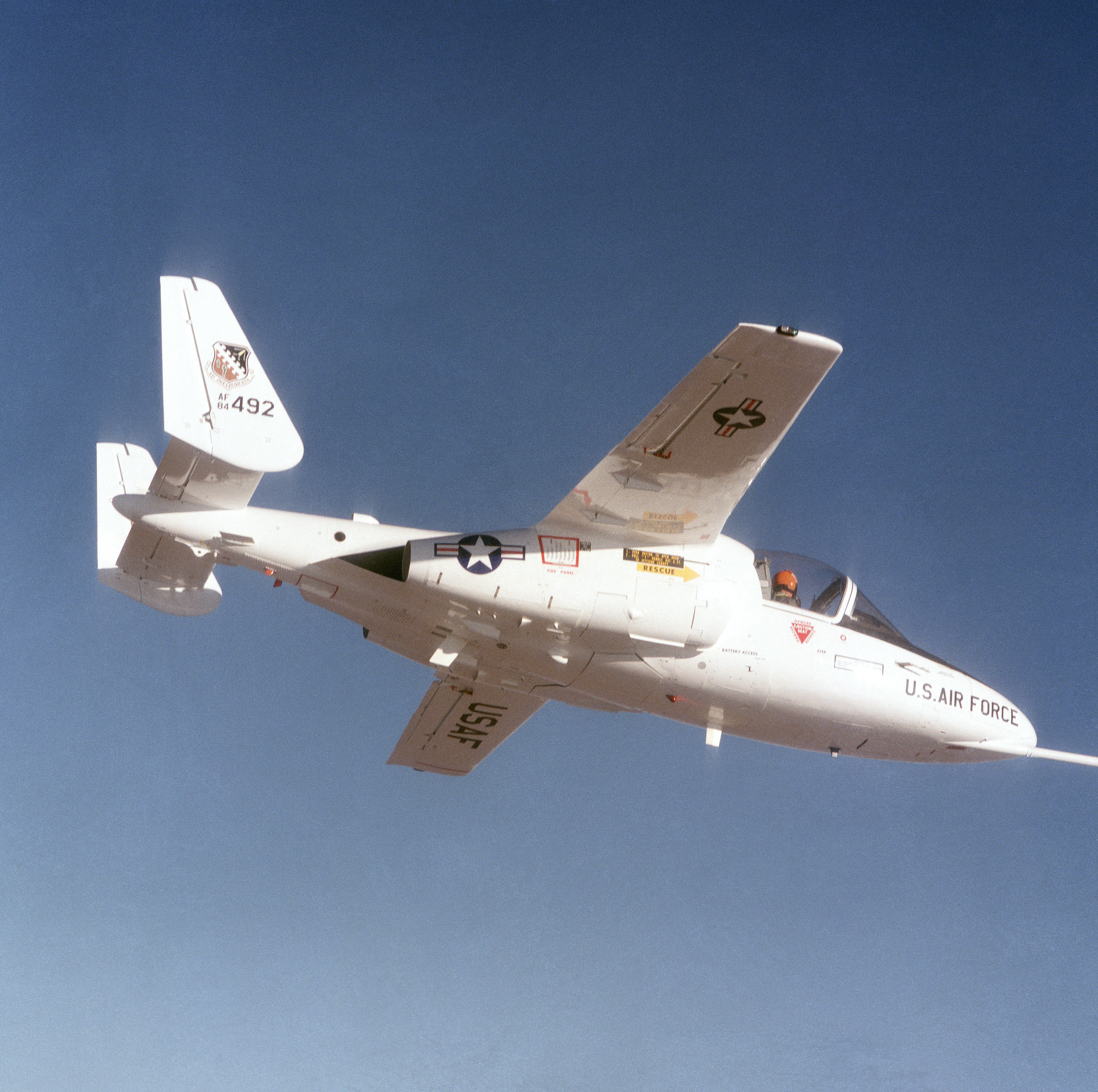
- A T-46 out of Edwards AFB

General information
- Type: Jet trainer aircraft
- Manufacturer: Fairchild Aircraft
- Status: Cancelled in 1988
- Primary user: United States Air Force
- Number built: 3

History
- First flight: 15 October 1985

The Fairchild T-46 is an American light jet trainer aircraft of the 1980s. It was cancelled in 1986 with only three aircraft being produced.

== Design and development ==
The United States Air Force (USAF) launched its Next Generation Trainer (NGT) program to replace the Cessna T-37 Tweet primary trainer in 1981. The requirement was for a twin-engined aircraft with side by-side seating for the trainee pilot and instructor (a similar layout to that used by the T-37), while the new aircraft, unlike the T-37, would have a pressurised cockpit and be fitted with ejection seats. Part of the rationale for pressurization was an expectation of increasing levels of general aviation traffic. A pressurized trainer would permit training at higher altitude, leading to fewer restrictions on the new pilots. Fairchild-Republic, General Dynamics, North American Rockwell and Vought were given contracts to develop conceptual designs, while Cessna was instructed to study improved T-37s. Fairchild-Republic submitted a shoulder-winged monoplane with a twin tail, powered by two Garrett F109 turbofans.

In order to validate the proposed aircraft's design, and to explore its flight handling characteristics, Fairchild Republic contracted with Ames Industries of Bohemia, New York to build a flyable 62% scale version. Burt Rutan's Rutan Aircraft Factory in Mojave, California was contracted to perform the flight test evaluations, with test pilot Dick Rutan doing the flying. The scale version was known at Rutan as the Model 73 NGT, this flying on 10 September 1981. One requirement was for the aircraft to be able to go into a spin, but to also have easy recovery from the spin. This was demonstrated using the Model 73 NGT.

Fairchild's design, to be designated T-46, was announced winner of the competition on 2 July 1982, with the USAF placing an order for two prototypes and options for 54 production aircraft. It was planned to build 650 T-46s for the USAF by 1991.

The aircraft first flew on 15 October 1985, six months later than the originally programmed date of 15 April. Costs had increased significantly during the development process, with the predicted unit cost rising from $1.5 million in 1982 to $3 million in February 1985. The 1985 Gramm–Rudman–Hollings Balanced Budget Act mandated spending cuts for the US government in an attempt to limit the national debt, and while testing did not reveal any major problems, Secretary of the Air Force Russell A. Rourke cancelled procurement of the T-46, while allowing limited development to continue. While attempts were made in Congress to reinstate the program, which resulted in the FY 1987 budget being delayed, an amendment was passed to the 1987 Appropriations Bill to forbid any spending on the T-46 until further evaluation of the T-46 against the T-37 and other trainers took place.

The project was formally cancelled on 13 March 1987, which resulted in Fairchild closing the Fairchild Republic factory in Farmingdale, New York.

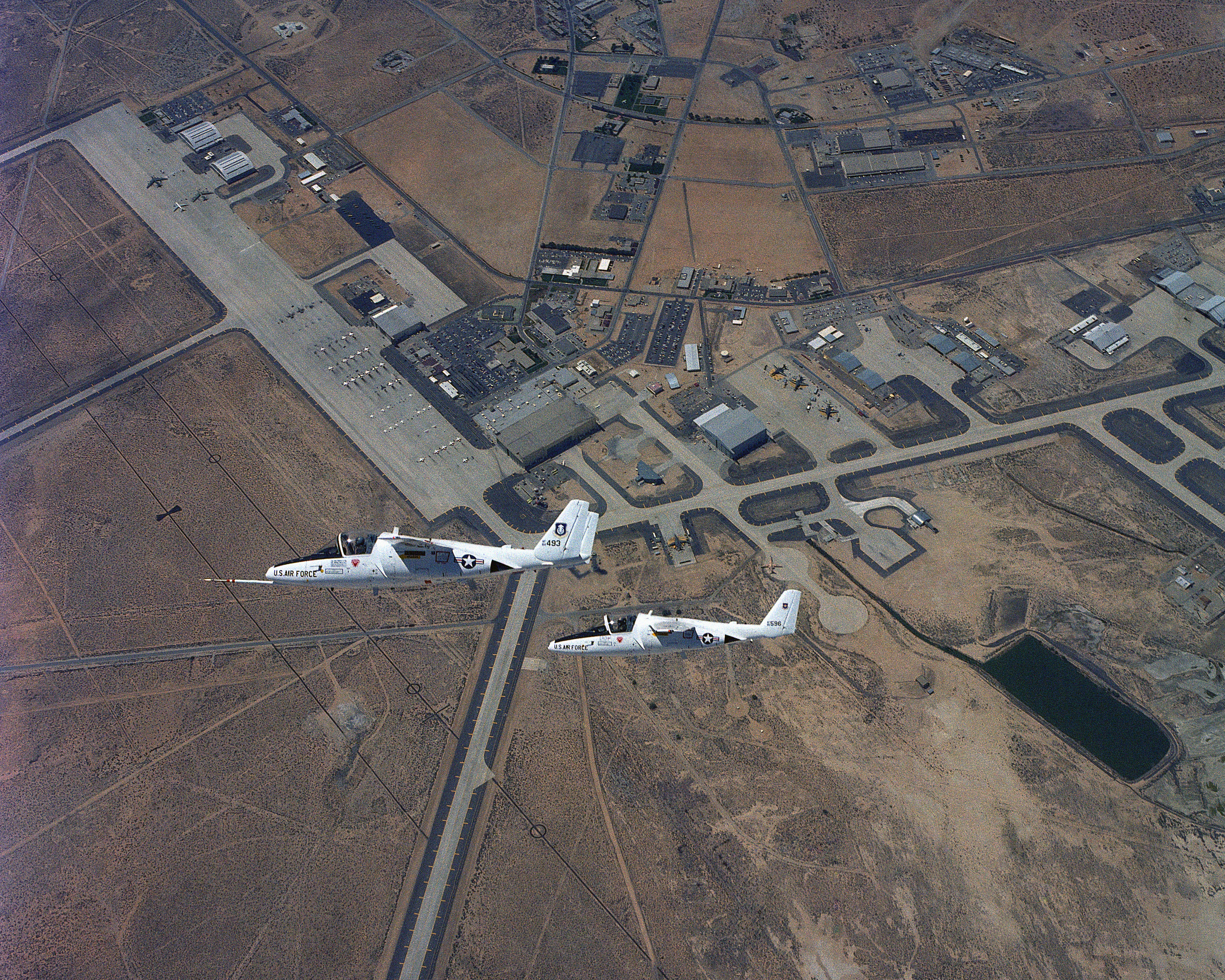
Two T-46 aircraft circling Edwards AFB

The aircraft itself featured a side-by-side configuration, a twin (or "H") tail (similar to the company's A-10), ejection seats, pressurization, and two turbofan engines. Had it gone into full production the NGT program called for 650 aircraft being built up to 1992. There was potential for some overseas sales as well, such as in the light ground attack role in addition to its role as a trainer.

== Operators ==
United States

- United States Air Force

== Aircraft on display ==
All three prototypes have been preserved:

- 84-0492 can be seen at the Air Force Flight Test Center Museum at Edwards Air Force Base, California.
- 84-0493 is under restoration at the National Museum of the United States Air Force.
- 85-1596 can be seen at the AMARG "Celebrity Row" during the AMARG bus tour from the Pima Air Museum, Arizona
- The Model 73 NGT Flight Demonstrator can be seen at the Cradle of Aviation Museum, New York

== Specifications (T-46) (performance estimated) ==
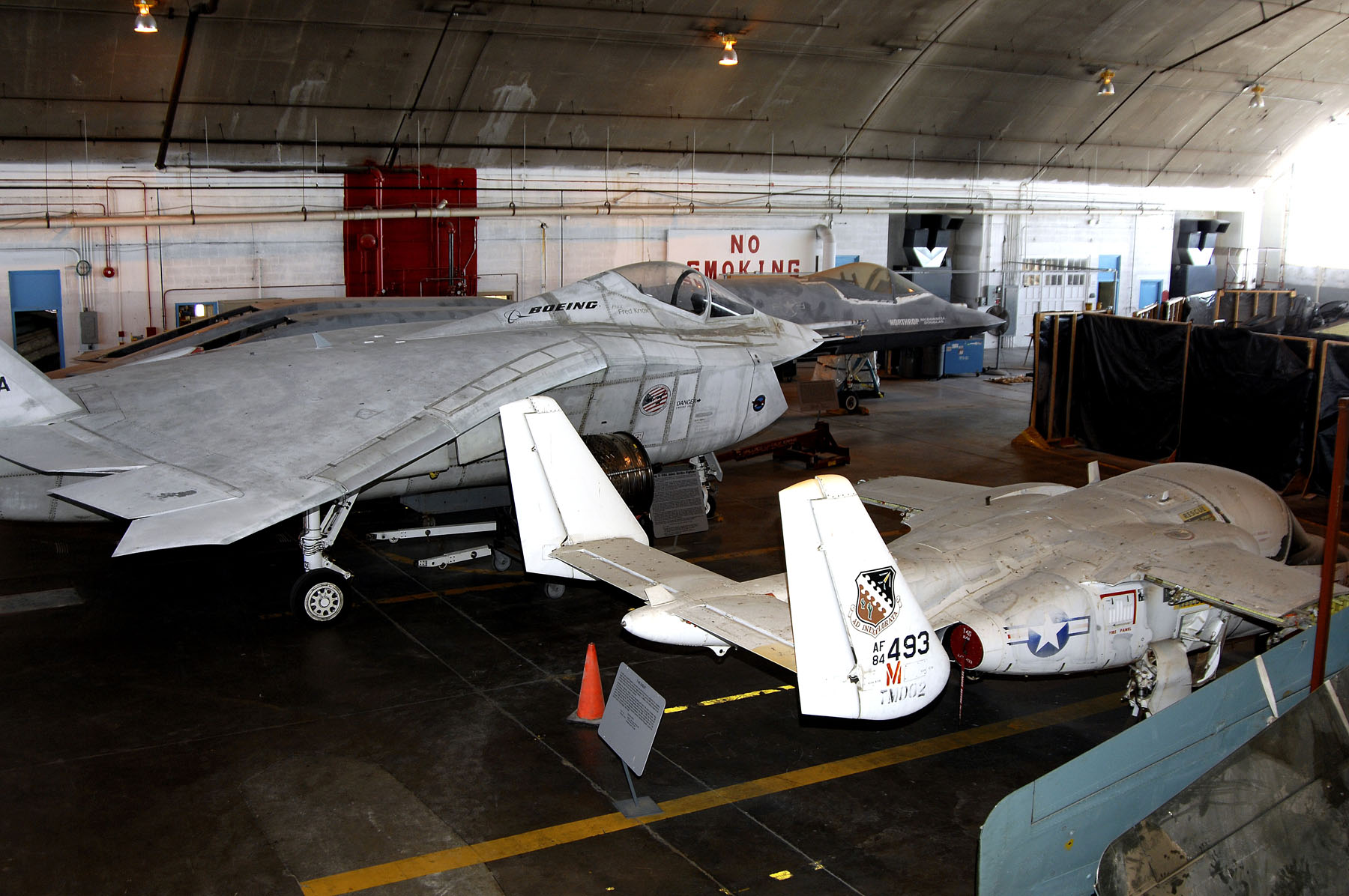
T-46, X-32 and YF-23 in the restoration area of the National Museum of the United States Air Force

Data from Tweety-Bird Replacement

General characteristics

- Crew: 2
- Length: 29 ft 6 in (8.99 m)
- Wingspan: 38 ft 7 3/4 in (11.779 m)
- Height: 9 ft 11 3/4 in (3.042 m)
- Wing area: 160.9 sq ft (14.95 m^{2})
- Aspect ratio: 9.28:1
- Airfoil: NASA LS(1)
- Empty weight: 5,275 lb (2,393 kg)
- Max takeoff weight: 6,962 lb (3,158 kg)
- Fuel capacity: 200 US gal (170 imp gal; 760 L)
- Powerplant: 2 × Garrett F109-GA-100 turbofans, 1,330 lbf (5.9 kN) thrust each

Performance

- Maximum speed: 397 kn (457 mph, 735 km/h) at 25,000 ft (7,600 m)
- Cruise speed: 333 kn (383 mph, 617 km/h) at 45,000 ft (14,000 m)
- Range: 1,190 nmi (1,370 mi, 2,200 km)
- Service ceiling: 46,500 ft (14,200 m)
- Take-off distance to 50 ft (15 m): 1,520 ft (460 m)

== See also ==
- JPATS

Aircraft of comparable role, configuration, and era

- Beechcraft T-6 Texan II
- Cessna T-37 Tweet
- Saab 105

== Notes ==
=== Bibliography ===
- Braybrook, Roy. "A-109, NGT, VTX-TS and...All That Alphabet Soup". Air International, February 1981, Vol. 20, No. 2, pp. 75–79. ISSN 0306-5634
- Braybrook, Roy. "Tweety-Bird Replacement". Air International, June 1985, Vol 28, No. 6. pp. 273–280. ISSN 0306-5634
- "Fairchild wins NGT". Flight International, 17 July 1982, p. 122.
- Mormillo, Frank B. "T-46A: The Trainer of the Future?" Aircraft Illustrated, December 1986, Vol. 19, No. 12. pp. 648–653.
- "T-46A is flown". Flight International 26 October 1985, p. 8.
- Taylor, John W. R. (editor) Jane's All the World's Aircraft 1986–87. London: Jane's Yearbooks, 1986. ISBN 0-7106-0835-7.
- Taylor, John W. R. (editor) Jane's All the World's Aircraft 1987–88. London: Jane's Yearbooks, 1987. ISBN 0-7106-0850-0.
- "USAF trainer contest opened to all" Flight International, 8 November 1986, p. 9.
- Warwick, Graham "T-46: A Class Apart". Flight International, 13 April 1985, pp. 24–29.
