= Voice warning system =

Spoken alerts for vehicle pilots

A voice warning system is a system designed to alert the crew of an aircraft to imminent safety hazards. It is often known as a Bitching Betty, a slang term used by some pilots, aircrew and submariners (mainly North American).

The annunciation voice, in at least some aircraft systems, may be either male or female. In some cases, this may be selected according to pilot preference. If the voice is female, it may be referred to as Bitching Betty; if the voice is male, it may be referred to as Barking Bob. A female voice is heard on military aircraft such as the F-16 Fighting Falcon, the Eurofighter Typhoon and the Mikoyan MiG-29. A male voice is heard on Boeing commercial airliners and is also used in the BAE Hawk.

In the United Kingdom, the term Nagging Nora is sometimes used. In New Zealand, the term used for Boeing aircraft is Hank the Yank. The voice warning system used on London Underground trains, which also uses a female voice, is known to some staff as Sonya, as it "gets on ya nerves".

== Notable examples ==
There are two notable systems, which employ voice warnings, and which are found in most commercial and military aircraft: TCAS (traffic collision avoidance system) and TAWS/EGPWS (terrain avoidance warning system / enhanced ground proximity warning system). Both systems provide warnings and verbal instructions.

The auditory warnings produced by these systems usually include a separate attention-getting sound, followed by one or more verbal commands to the pilot/crew. Perhaps the most widely known example, encountered in many video games and movies, is the "Pull up! Pull up!" command. Other common spoken warnings are "Terrain, terrain", "Windshear! Windshear!", or "Traffic! Traffic!". These may be followed by short directions to the pilot, advising how the situation may be resolved. TCAS and TAWS/EGPWS are usually integrated to prevent conflicting advice, such as an instruction to "Descend! Descend!" to avoid another aircraft when the aircraft is already close to the ground.

Modern Boeing and Airbus airliners both feature a male voice, which calls out height above terrain on approach to landing, and other related warnings. Airbus aircraft feature a distinctive British RP accent (heard on recent builds of the A320 and all Airbus aircraft since the A330 and A340), or a French accent (heard on ECAM-equipped A300s, A310s and early A320s).

A female voice was incorporated into McDonnell Douglas DC-9, MD-80/90, McDonnell Douglas MD-11 and Boeing 717 (inherited from McDonnell Douglas after the merger with Boeing) series aircraft in their Central Aural Warning Systems (CAWS). These systems provided a voice for most warnings, including fire, altitude, cabin altitude, stall, overspeed, autopilot disconnect, and so on.

In more advanced cockpits, on newer aircraft, there may be many other voice warnings managed by an integrated indication and crew alerting system (ICAS) such as "Gear up, Gear up!" These may be warning words or phrases, or simply declarative statements that augment the pilot's situation awareness.

== Voice gender ==
Early human factors research in aircraft and other domains indicated that female voices were more authoritative to male pilots and crew members and were more likely to get their attention. Much of this research was based on pilot experiences, particularly in combat situations, where the pilots were being guided by female air traffic controllers. They reported being able to most easily pick out the female voice from amid the flurry of radio chatter.

In October 1996, a report by UK's Defence Research Agency on the fast jet Collision Warning System Technical Demonstrator Programme (Reference DRAMS/A VS/CR96294/1) reported: "The primary alerting signal from the CWS to the crew was an audible warning passed over the aircraft intercom system. For the first flight these warnings were given in a male voice but, on the advice of the crew, this was changed to a female voice for the second flight onwards. They said that a female voice offered greater clarity."

More recent research, however, carried out since more women have been employed as pilots and air traffic controllers, indicates that the original popular hypothesis may be unreliable. Edworthy and colleagues in 2003, based at the University of Plymouth in UK, for example, found that both acoustic and non-acoustic differences between male and female speakers were negligible. Therefore, they recommended the choice of speaker should depend on the overlap of noise and speech spectra. Female voices did appear to have an advantage because they could portray a greater range of urgencies due to their generally higher pitch and pitch range. They reported an experiment showing that knowledge about the sex of a speaker has no effect on judgments of perceived urgency, with acoustic variables accounting for such differences.

Arrabito in 2009, however, at Defence Research and Development Canada in Toronto, found that with simulated cockpit background radio traffic, a male voice rather than a female voice, in a monotone or urgent announcing style, resulted in the largest proportion of correct and fastest identification response times to verbal warnings, regardless of the gender of the listener.

== Voices ==
There have been several "Bitching Bettys", over the years, for various commercial and military aircraft:

- Kim Crow – contributed her voice to U.S. and NATO aircraft.
- Gina Drazin – provided the voice for the system in the Convair B-58 Hustler.
- Erica Lane – her voice can be heard in the General Dynamics F-16 Fighting Falcon and Boeing AH-64 Apache helicopter.
- Sue Milne – her voice is used in the Eurofighter Typhoon.
- Leslie Shook – her voice is used in the Boeing F/A-18E/F Super Hornet. Shook retired in 2016.
- Patricia Hoyt – her voice was used in the Boeing 717 and the Boeing C-17 Globemaster III. She was working in the Boeing 717 program as a mechanical engineer at the time.

== Other applications ==
Voice warning systems included in cars of the late 1970s to early 1980s, such as the Datsun and Nissan "Z-Car" series, found in the 280ZX and 1984–1988 300ZX (optional in the base model and standard in the Turbo model), and the Datsun Maxima and Nissan Maxima of the early 1980s, were also known as Bitching Betty. The Datsun system issued commands such as "lights are on", or "left door is open". The system used a small box located under the vehicle's dashboard that implemented a small, white plastic record disc that used a magnetic cartridge to play spoken commands using the vehicle audio system, similar to that of some Texas Instruments talking toys of the time period. Datsun's original name for the feature was "Talking Lady".

Some Acuras (Honda's luxury car marque in the United States, Canada, and China) of the mid 2000s would ask the driver to "please fasten your seatbelt" when the driver's seatbelt was not fastened, in addition to a chime warning.

The M1 Abrams tank features a female voice warning system to warn the crew of open hatches and critical faults when equipped with the System Enhancement Package.

== See also ==
- Ground proximity warning system
- Terrain awareness and warning system
- Airborne collision avoidance system
- Runway Awareness and Advisory System
