= Runway Awareness and Advisory System =

Computer systen in airplanes

The Runway Awareness and Advisory System (RAAS) is an electronic detection system that notifies aircraft flight crews on the ground of their position relative to their allocated runway. It is a type of Runway Situation Awareness Tool (RSAT).

== Overview ==
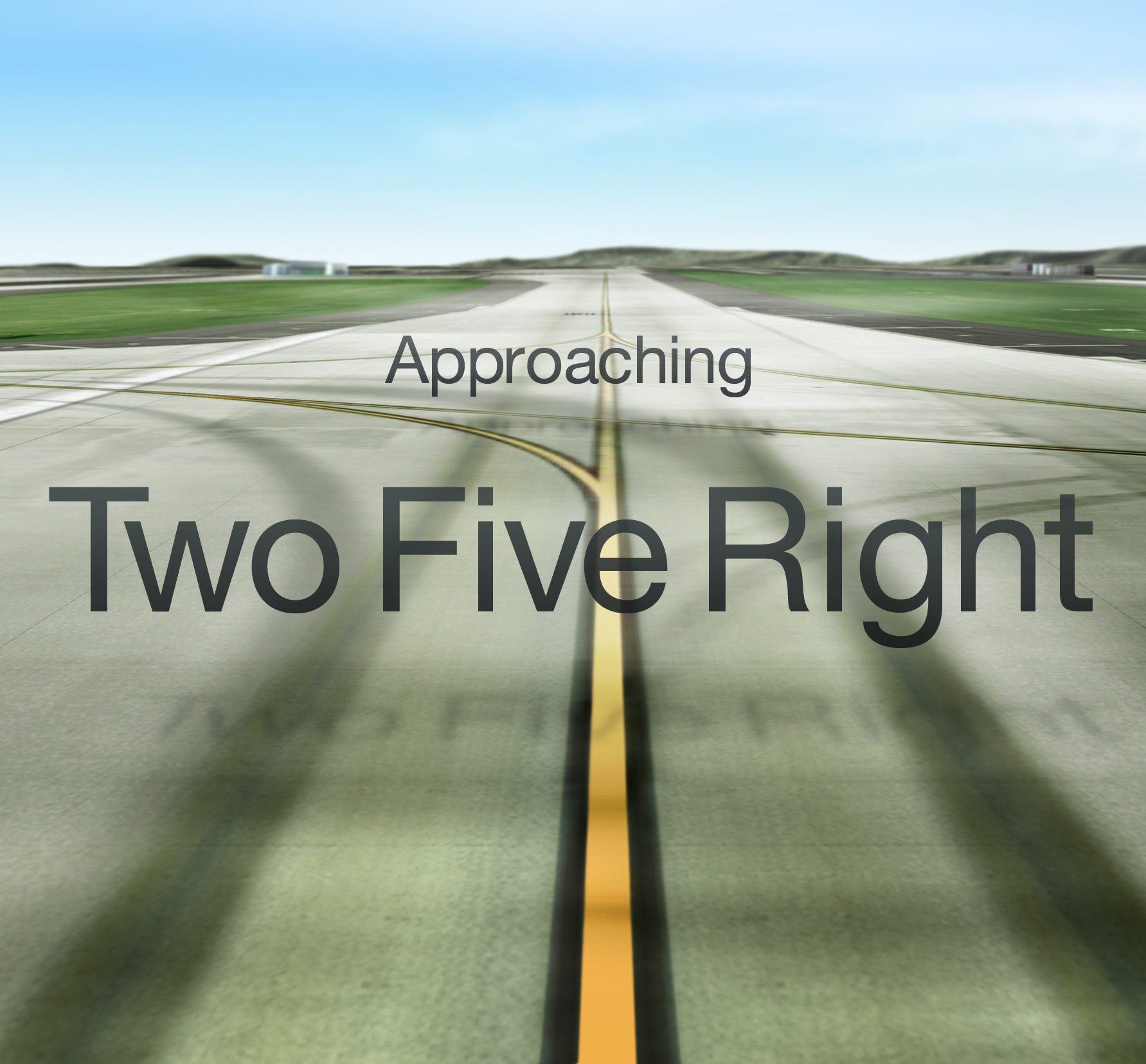
A view from the SmartRunway system that is often added to RAAS.

According to Honeywell Aerospace, who developed the original RAAS, runway incursions are a leading cause of aviation accidents and fatalities, costing approximately $1 billion annually.

RAAS functions by providing audible alerts to confirm runway identification, and also provides an aural alarm if it detects undue acceleration (indicating an attempt to take off) while the aircraft is on any taxiway instead of a designated runway. Its function is possible by a software enhancement to the aircraft's terrain awareness and warning system (TAWS) or enhanced ground proximity warning system (EGPWS).

== Entrance into service ==
Alaska Airlines announced in September 2008 that its entire airline fleet of Boeing 737s will be equipped with RAAS by the end of September. That has been the first airline fleet to be completely equipped with this system. Ryanair was the first European airline to introduce RAAS. In 2016 Ryanair committed to equip all its fleet with RAAS, which was mostly complete by 2019.

Boeing 737 MAXs are equipped with Boeing's version of RAAS, as part of its Runway Situational Awareness Tools (RSAT).

Honeywell also offer systems called SmartRunway and SmartLanding, which are software options for the enhanced ground proximity warning system.

== See also ==
- Airborne collision avoidance system
- Voice warning system
