= Universal Avionics =

Universal Avionics Systems Corporation
- Type: Subsidiary
- Industry: Aerospace
- Founded: 1981
- Founder: Hubert L. Naimer
- Headquarters: Tucson, Arizona, United States
- Key people: Dror Yahav (Chief executive officer)
- Products: Avionics, including Flight Management Systems
- Number of employees: 570 (2007)
- Parent: Elbit Systems
- Website: uasc.com

Universal Avionics Systems Corporation, also known as Universal Avionics, is an international company headquartered in Tucson, Arizona in the United States. It primarily focuses on flight management systems (FMS) and cockpit instrument displays for private, business, and commercial aircraft. The company has domestic offices in Arizona, Kansas, Washington, and Georgia, and overseas offices in Switzerland.

== History ==
Universal Avionics was founded in 1981 by Hubert L. Naimer. Its first FMS was introduced in 1982. In 1999, Universal Avionics started its Instrument Division with the purchase of a line of flat panel integrated displays from Avionic Displays Corporation of Norcross, Georgia. On September 12, 2004, Hubert L. Naimer died and his son Joachim L. Naimer assumed the position of President and CEO. On September 25, 2007, the Federal Aviation Administration (FAA) gave TSO approval to Universal's WAAS/SBAS enabled Flight Management Systems. It was the first FMS to be certified for WAAS LPV. In March 2018 it was announced that the Naimer family was selling the company to Israel's Elbit Systems; the sale was completed the following month.

Following the acquisition Universal Avionics will operate, with new management from Elbit Systems of America and workforce under the same name, as a wholly owned U.S. subsidiary of Elbit Systems of America.

== Products ==
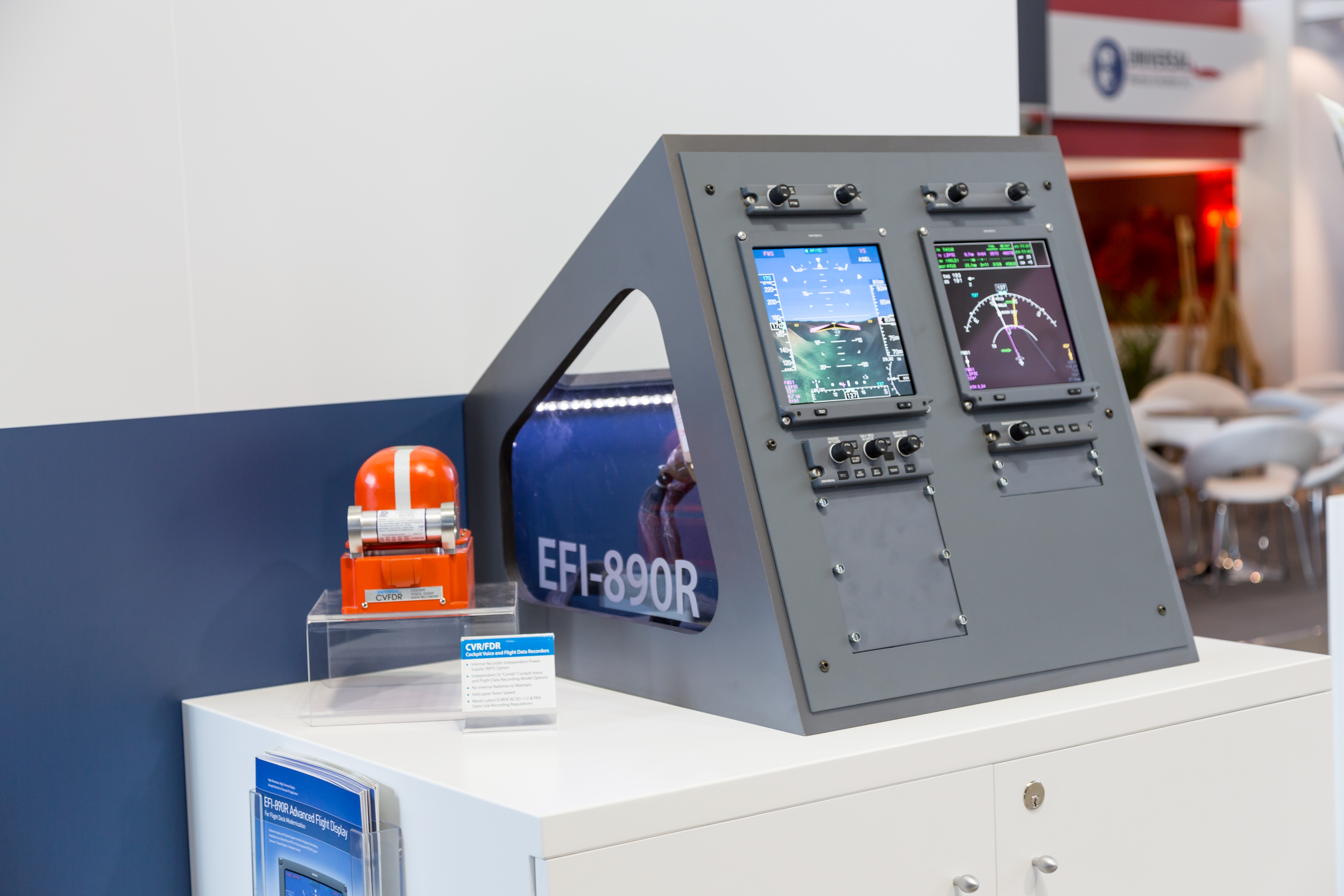
Universal Avionics flight displays

=== Flight Management Systems ===
Universal has been offering the UNS-1 line of Flight Management Systems since 1982.

=== Synthetic Vision ===
Universal offers the Vision-1 Synthetic Vision (SVS) System. The Vision-1 was the first SVS product certified for Part 25 aircraft.

=== Terrain Awareness and Warning System ===
Universal offers a Terrain Awareness and Warning System (TAWS) with a 3D perspective mode.

=== Flat Panel Integrated Displays ===
Universal offers Flat Panel Integrated Displays.

=== Communications Management Units ===
Universal offers the 1 MCU UniLink CMU (Communication Management Unit) with or without a built-in VDR (VHF Data Radio). The UniLink CMU is capable of operating in 25 kHz and 8.333 kHz channel spacing environments and operating as part of the ACARS data network.
