= Honeywell Aerospace =

American industrial company

Honeywell Aerospace Inc.
- Logo since June 2026
- Type: Public
- Traded as: Nasdaq: HONA; Nasdaq-100 component; S&P 500 component
- Industry: Aerospace
- Founded: 1936; 90 years ago
- Headquarters: Phoenix, Arizona, U.S.
- Key people: Jim Currier (President & CEO); Josh Jepsen (CFO)
- Products: Aircraft engines, Avionics, satellites, spacecraft, black boxes
- Revenue: ▲US$15 billion (2024)
- Number of employees: c. 40,000
- Parent: Honeywell (until June 29, 2026)
- Website: www.honeywellaerospace.com

Honeywell Aerospace Inc. is an independent American manufacturer of aircraft engines, avionics, auxiliary power units (APUs), navigation equipment, life-support and environmental control systems, hydraulics, flight data recorders, and other aviation and space systems. Headquartered in Phoenix, Arizona, it operates as one of the world's largest standalone tier-1 aerospace and defense suppliers. The company generates approximately $15 billion in annual revenue from a balanced portfolio of commercial and military defense contracts.

== History ==
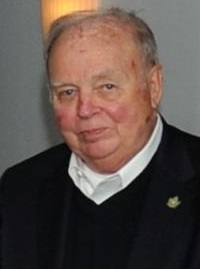
Longtime Honeywell safety engineer Don Bateman, inventor of the ground proximity warning system (GPWS)

Originally a core division of the Honeywell International conglomerate, the business was spun off into an independent, publicly-traded corporate entity effective June 29, 2026, following formal approval from the Honeywell Board of Directors on June 15, 2026. Following the structural separation, the remaining automation segments of the original parent company were renamed Honeywell Technologies.

The company experienced a foundational manufacturing boom during World War II, when it equipped Allied bomber aircraft with specialized avionics and invented the modern electronic autopilot. After the war, it successfully shifted focus toward commercial aviation and peacetime applications. Today, Honeywell Aerospace produces advanced space exploration equipment, micro-electronic systems, turbine engines, braking systems, synthetic vision, runway safety infrastructure, and flight deck avionics.

A Honeywell APU was instrumental in maintaining backup systems during the emergency river landing of US Airways Flight 1549, and a ruggedized Honeywell flight data recorder survived underwater for nearly two years to provide critical diagnostics for the investigation into Air France Flight 447. The company has historically contributed to nearly 90 percent of United States space missions, including design consulting for technical props in 2001: A Space Odyssey. It continues to be a core development partner in the U.S. Federal Aviation Administration's NextGen program and the European Union's SESAR modernization frameworks.

In 2010, President Barack Obama awarded longtime Honeywell safety engineer Don Bateman the National Medal of Technology for his development of ground proximity warning systems which radically reduced controlled flight into terrain accidents. The company holds an extensive patent portfolio detailing flight windshield engineering, aerospace turbochargers, and satellite communications hardware, following the resolution of a notable historical 11-year patent dispute regarding ring laser gyroscope technology.

== Business ==
Honeywell Aerospace was responsible for over thirty percent of Honeywell's total revenue with half from commercial contracts and half from defense contracts. The division generates $15 billion in annual sales. In 2010, 75 percent of revenue was from the Americas.

Honeywell expects future revenue sources to be more geographically diverse as aviation grows in emerging markets like India and Africa. In these regions, a lack of ground support encourages the use of additional cockpit avionics to prevent crashes and determine flight routes. Honeywell publishes a regular business aviation forecast, which acknowledged a significant decline from 2008 to 2010, but expected recovery to 2008 levels by 2017.

== Operations ==
Honeywell Aerospace operates manufacturing, engineering and maintenance facilities worldwide. In 2026, it reported 61 manufacturing sites and 32 research and development facilities. The company is headquartered in Phoenix, Arizona, where it also produces aircraft engines. In Minnesota, its Minneapolis and Plymouth facilities develop and manufacture navigation equipment, such as gyroscopes and accelerometers.

In Europe, the Yeovil plant craft environmental control, life-support and hydraulic systems, while the facility in Raunheim repairs and overhauls auxiliary power units and other aircraft components.

Honeywell's Brno engineering centre works on avionics, flight data recorders and systems for unmanned aircraft. Its factory in nearby Hlubočky manufactures and repairs aircraft-engine components. The company also has engineering operations in Poland and develops navigation technologies in Italy through Civitanavi Systems.

In Asia, Honeywell manufactures avionics in Penang, and develops aviation software and systems in Bengaluru. Its Singapore facilities handle aircraft-component manufacturing, maintenance and repair.

== History ==
=== Corporate history ===
Honeywell Aerospace Technologies began in 1914. Over nearly a century, through various acquisitions, mergers and name changes, Honeywell Aerospace Technologies combined legacy companies Sperry, Bendix, Garrett AiResearch, Pioneer, Lycoming, Grimes, King Radio and AlliedSignal. Garrett Corporation also acquired Aero Engineering Inc., Aero Sales Engineering, Ltd. and Air Cruisers Company in 1954.

Following the death of its founder John Cliff Garrett in 1963, Garrett Corporation merged with Signal Oil & Gas Company to avoid a hostile takeover by Curtiss-Wright. In 1968, Signal Oil & Gas was renamed The Signal Companies. In 1982 Allied Corporation acquired Bendix Aerospace after coming in late in a protracted fight involving Bendix, Martin Marietta, and United Technologies. Originally, Bendix had tried to acquire Martin Marietta. Martin Marietta then bid for Bendix, and United Technologies entered the fray to help Martin Marietta. After the dust cleared, Allied Corporation was the apparent victor. In 1985 The Signal Companies merged with Allied Corporation forming Allied-Signal Inc. Allied-Signal (later renamed to Honeywell International in 1999) now includes [what was (in 1986) called] Honeywell Inc., and in 1986 Honeywell Inc. acquired Sperry Aerospace for $1.025 billion.

Allied-Signal acquired the Lycoming Turbine Engine Division of Textron in 1994 and Grimes in 1997. Allied-Signal acquired Honeywell in 1999 and changed the name of the resulting company to Honeywell International.

=== Early history ===
In the late 1930s Honeywell added temperature controls to moving vehicles like cars, trains and airplanes. This was more challenging than a traditional stationary furnace, because the temperature around a plane changes drastically as it climbs and descends. Honeywell provided the air conditioning system for America's first nuclear-powered submarine in 1954 and many Honeywell controls were used in the Manhattan Project.

John Clifford "Cliff" Garrett founded Aircraft Tool and Supply Company in a one-room office in Los Angeles in 1936 to create specialized parts for aviation. From 1936 to 1938 the company grew from $3,503 to $21,540 in profit and raised an additional $31,500 in capital. In 1938 Cliff Garrett declared the company had hit a downturn, because many manufacturers they had previously sold products from had developed their own sales offices. In response, Cliff shifted focus to developing and manufacturing patented aviation products. In 1938 the company changed its name to Garrett Corporation. In 1939, Garrett formed Garrett AiResearch Manufacturing Co. to design, create and sell patented aviation products. The first invented product was an all-aluminum aircraft intercooler that was used to give Boeing B-17 bombers high-altitude abilities. Garrett also built Defense Plant Corporation in 1942.

=== World War II & defense ===
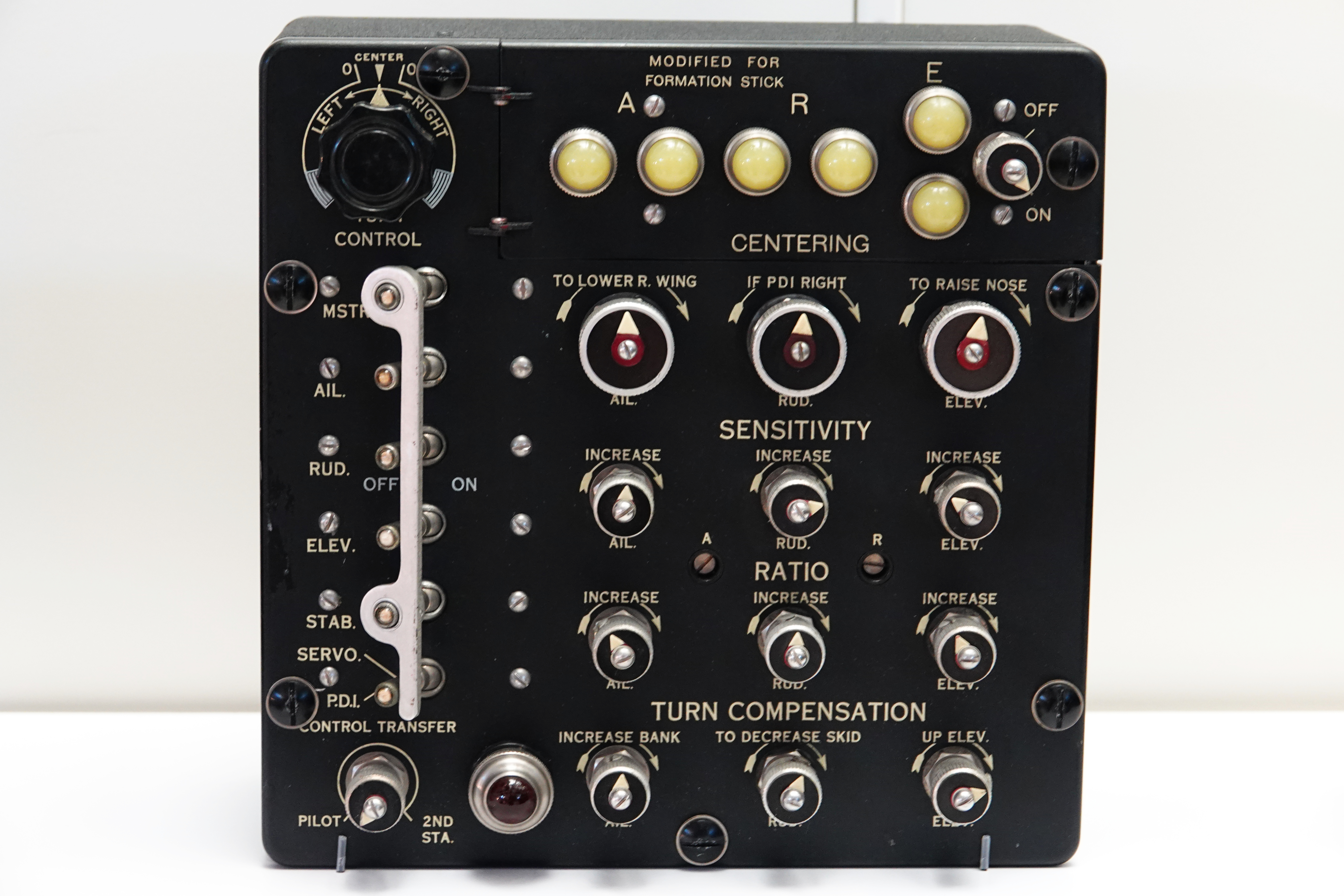
Honeywell C-1 autopilot control panel

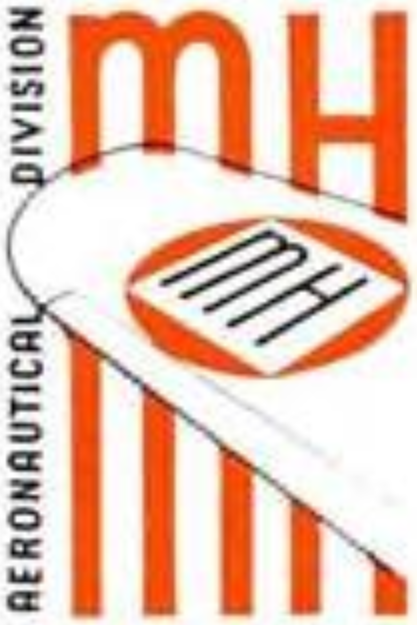
Minneapolis-Honeywell Aeronautical Division logo from 1944

Garrett AiResearch's first major product was an oil cooler for military aircraft that allowed the Douglas DB-7, and Boeing's B-17 and B-25 bombers to fly at higher altitudes. Garrett also developed and produced the pressurization technology for the pressurized cabins in the B-29 bomber and the air expansion cooling turbines for the Lockheed P-80 Shooting Star.

During World War II, the invention of the Norden bombsight allowed bomber planes to hit precision targets from high altitudes, but at 25,000 feet a single degree of oscillation in the plane's flight course threw a bomb 400 feet off its target. The Flight Control Equipment system commonly known as "auto-pilot" was initially invented by Sperry so World War II bomber planes could fly steady enough to hit precise targets from high altitudes. The first Honeywell C-1 autopilot installation was on a B-17 in 1942.

The C-1 autopilot system created rumors in mainstream media regarding crewless autopilot planes flying for thousands of miles, creating diversions for enemy squads and maintaining a steady flight despite extensive damage. The autopilot technology was kept secret until 1943, when it became clear Germany had caught wind of it by salvaging downed US bombers.

Sperry, Bendix and Grimes all produced equipment for World War II planes like instruments, navigation, electronics, wheels and lighting systems. During World War II Bendix made just about every ancillary instrument or equipment for military aircraft. Garrett Corporation initially produced intercoolers, air coolers and cabin pressurization regulators. During the war Garrett expanded to manufacturing its own actuators, auxiliary power units, mechanical shutters and turbochargers. Since then all of these companies have merged and ultimately became a part of Honeywell.

Honeywell was responsible for many of the cockpit technologies in the first mass-produced, four-engine heavy bomber, the B-17 Flying Fortress.

In the beginning of the war most turbochargers were manually controlled superchargers that used mechanical energy from the engine to force air into the combustion process through the intake manifold. The exhaust based turbocharger most common today was first created for World War II bomber planes and became stock equipment on B-17, B-24 and B-29 bombers.

World War II was a boon for Garrett AiResearch, but the company had already been advertising peace-time products and created a New Products Investigation Group to identify post-war aerospace technology ideas. Nevertheless, the war's end resulted in deep cutbacks and layoffs for Garrett Corporation. The B-36 had more than 10,000 Garrett products in it and helped carry the company through the post-war transition. By 1948 Garrett Corporation had a $7.5 million backlog.

=== Turbine history ===
Near the end of World War II, Garrett got board approval and $1 million in research funding to develop turbine engines. The company began to create its first turbine engine called "the black box", but a tight contract deadline and a problem with turbine efficiency resulted in the expensive project being scrapped in 1946. The backward curved centrifugal compressor from the black box project was used in future designs and lessons from the project made the company discontinue axial turbines for radial ones. In October 1951, Garrett was awarded a $36 million contract by the U.S. Navy.

Additional turbine testing facilities and a young team of engineers with turbomachinery experience eventually created future turbine engines used in APUs in the late 1940s. Used initially as a ground cart for military jets and some commercial aircraft, the first airborne APU entered service on the Boeing 727 in 1962.

By the 1960s Garrett AiResearch controlled a substantial portion of the APU turbine market, which was not expected to grow. Speer pushed Garrett to take on larger incumbents in the general engine propulsion market, but did not get approval to "boot-strap" the development of the turboprop 331 engine until 1962. The Garrett TPE331 would be Garrett's (later Honeywell's) first fixed-wing general propulsion turbine.

=== Commercial avionics ===
An early landmark commercial avionics technology was the ring laser gyroscope (RLG), which was developed in 1958. Honeywell supported the "long and painful" development process, but was rewarded by the 1970s. Honeywell also developed the Laser Inertial Navigation system. Both RLG and the Laser Inertial System help navigation and automatic flight control systems measure altitude, position, velocity and rotation. By 1991, 45,000 RLG devices were sold.

Throughout the 1950s technicians experimented with a new device called the Electrically Suspended Gyroscope (ESG). The ESG was a rotating ball suspended within a shell using electrical fields. Because there was no contact between materials, there was virtually no wear and tear. The drift of the device was small enough to be difficult to measure and test. The first commercial ESG was built in 1959.

The acquisition of Sperry Aerospace for $1.029 billion led to the integration of both flight control and navigation systems in the cockpit, which led to several years of double digit growth. The Boeing 777 widebody jet made in 1995 was manufactured with a suite of new avionics technology developed by Honeywell over four years by 1,200 engineers. By the end of the same year, 20 space and aviation programs had purchased the same set of new technologies.

==== Legal settlement ====
Honeywell's ring laser gyroscope (RLG) system was at the heart of a patent lawsuit regarding the special optical coatings applied to mirrors inside the inertial guidance system. In 1990 Litton Industries, who Honeywell had just won a $400,000 settlement from, sued Honeywell for $2 billion. The lawsuit was both for patent claims and alleged unfair business practices that led to Honeywell's monopolization of the RLG market. Later Litton increased the claim to $6 billion on the basis patent infringement was willful. If successful, it would have been the largest patent victory in history. However, a jury only ruled in favor for $234 million in damages, which was overruled by a US District Court, saying the patent was unenforceable because it was an obvious combination of pre-existing technologies.

After 11 years of legal battles from 1990 to 2001, just before going to another round of appeals, the companies agreed to settle for $440 million to end the long dispute Honeywell called "time-consuming and distracting".

== Space ==
Honeywell Aerospace Technologies has been involved in most major space missions and projects. Some notable projects include:

- From 1966 to 1967 Honeywell developed its Orbital Scanner program for NASA's Langley Research Center.
- In 1958 it participated in Vanguard, the program that launched America's first successful earth satellite, Explorer I.
- In 1963 the company participated in an experiment called "APRE", which used a giant balloon to carry a camera to high altitudes to determine the effects of the atmosphere on photography.
- In 1964 Honeywell developed a complete space vehicle called Scanner.
- Honeywell also developed flight controls, computer systems and more for the nation's first reusable spacecraft dubbed the Space Shuttle.
- Honeywell also did work for the Skylab experiments, the Viking program and the Pioneer 10.

In 1966 a young filmmaker, Stanley Kubrick, started developing the movie 2001: A Space Odyssey. Five Honeywell engineers were assigned to the project to create plausible fictional space technologies.

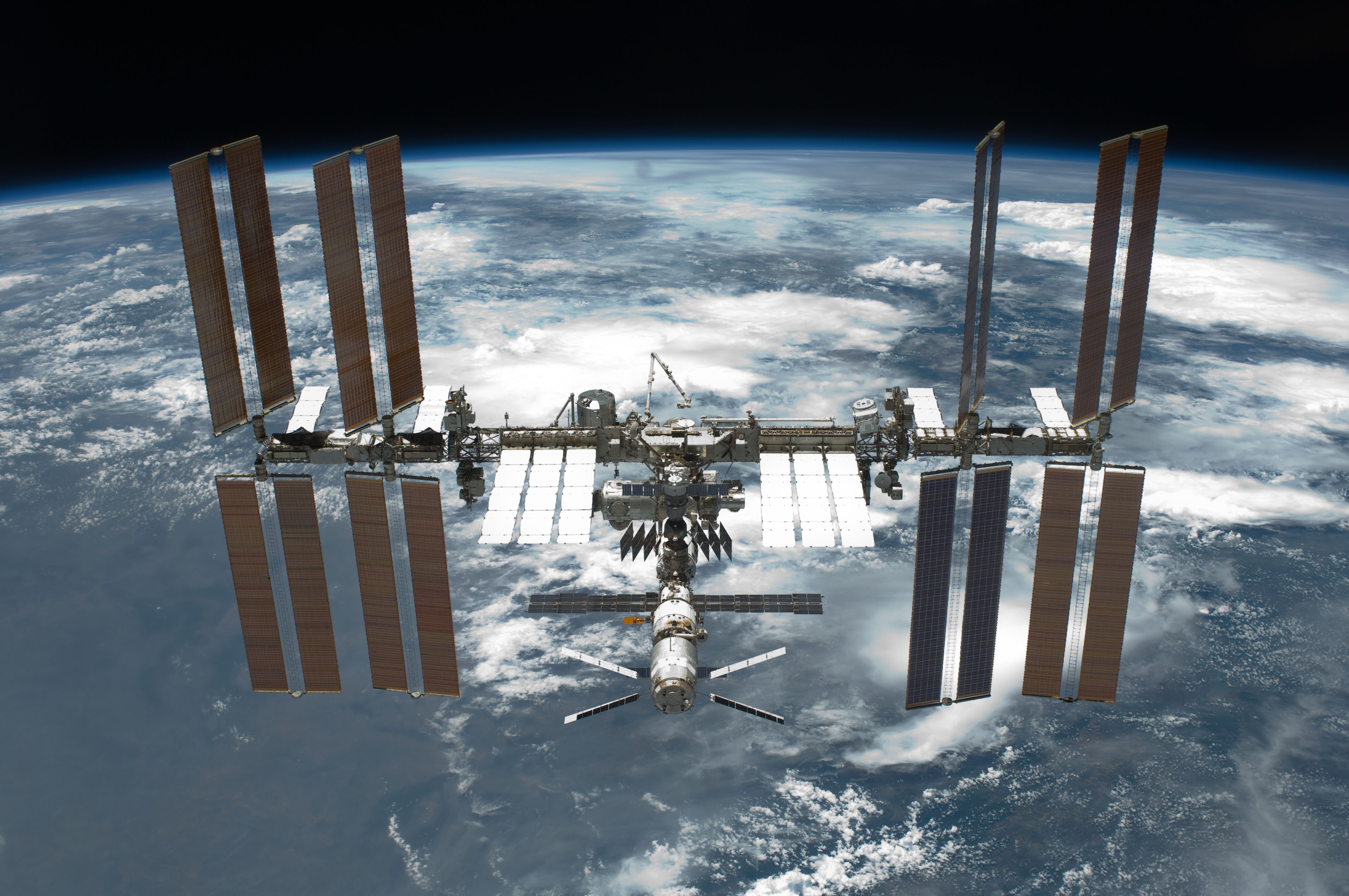
Honeywell provided controls to the International Space Station (ISS).

Space-related business did not recover for Honeywell after the end of the space race until the 1990s. Honeywell was awarded a notable contract to provide controls to the International Space Station, a joint project of the Russian, European, Italian, Japanese, Canadian and US space agencies.

Honeywell also manufactures Manned Mobile Units (MMUs), commonly known as space suits. Honeywell's space division is focused on three areas:

- Flights and ground system operations. Ground operations and control, managing health and safety of satellites, voice & data communications and operations engineering.
- Science data processing. Processing signal data from satellites, spaceships or ground control as well as flight projects and experiments.
- Mission support. Flight data system support, analysis of flight software requirements, software design, implementation, testing and anomaly investigation. Engineers hardware and software systems.

== Turbine engines ==
=== Military ===
Honeywell's LV50 Integrated Turbine Power Pack Systems are used in ground-based military vehicles. AGT-1500s power the U.S. Army's M1 Abrams tank series and was originally developed by Lycoming.

The Honeywell F124 series is used in military jets, such as the Aero L-159 Alca and the Alenia Aermacchi M-346.

=== Aircraft ===
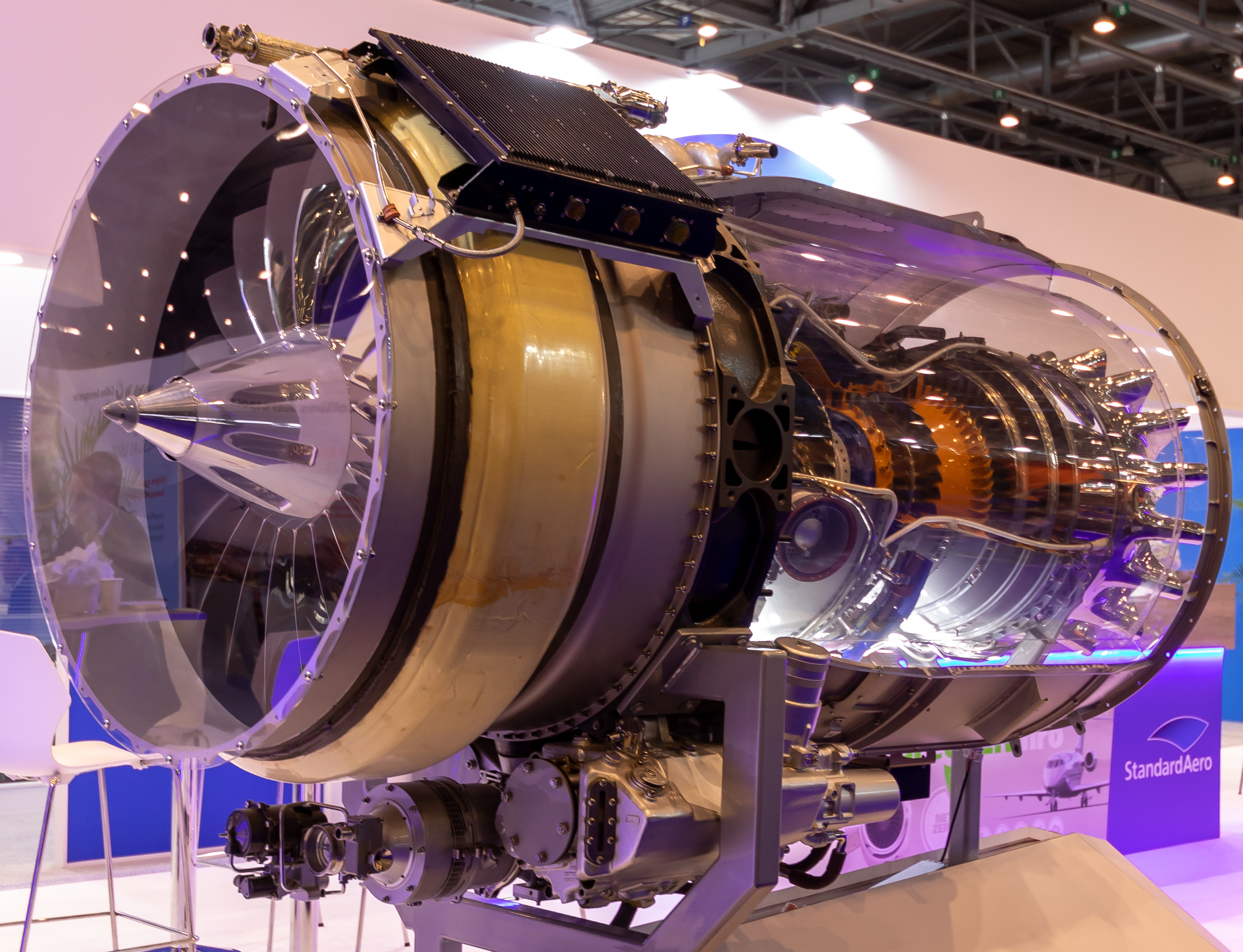
HTF700 turbofan engine

The Honeywell ALF502 and LF507 turbofans power the British Aerospace 146 family of airliners. Honeywell also partners with General Electric Aircraft Engines in a company called CFE Corporation that develops the CFE738 series, a 6,000 pound thrust engine.

The TFE731 family of turbofan aircraft engines have accumulated nearly 90 million service hours in aircraft since 1972. There are more than 8,500 TFE engines in service on business aircraft. The TPE331 turbine engines were first developed in the 1960s, and have been installed in small aircraft conversions since the mid-1990s. Honeywell's ATF3 turbofan engine is installed in Dassault Falcon 20 aircraft used by the US Coast Guard and the French Navy.

The Honeywell HTF7000 series is used in the Bombardier Challenger 300 and the Gulfstream G280.

=== Helicopters ===
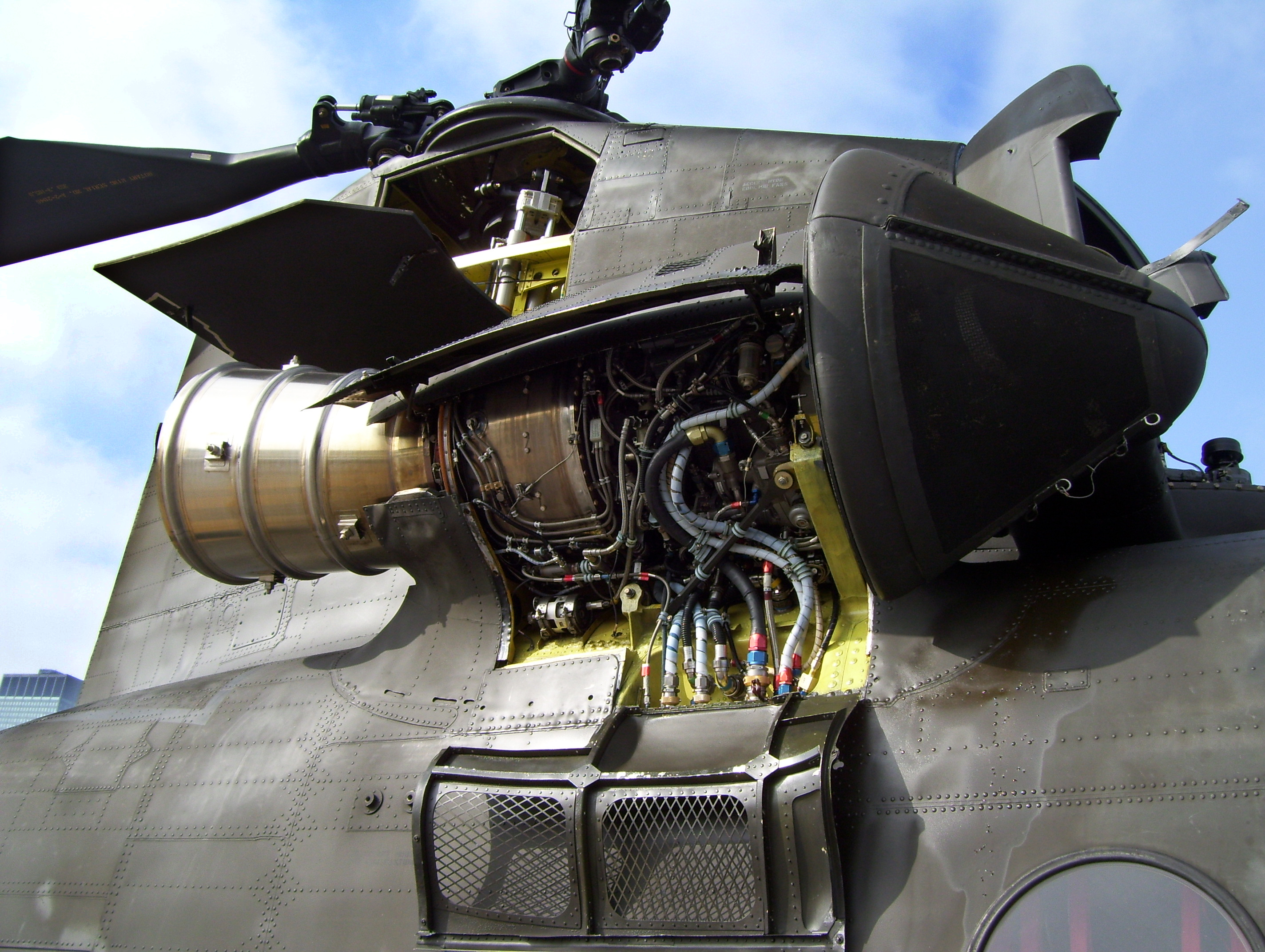
T55 engine on a Boeing CH-47 Chinook

Honeywell turbine engines are used in a wide variety of helicopters. The Lycoming T53 & T55 are used in the Bell UH-1H Huey, the Bell 214, the Boeing CH-47 Chinook, and the LTS101 series is used in some variants of the Bell 222, Eurocopter AS350 AStar, Eurocopter AS365 Dauphin, and MBB-Kawasaki BK117. The Honeywell HTS900/LTS101 family of turboshaft engines have accumulated nine million flight hours of operation in helicopters.

The T800 turboshaft engine is a product of Light Helicopter Turbine Engine Co., a joint venture between Honeywell and Rolls-Royce. The T800 is a new generation turboshaft engine developed for military helicopters, and is known as the CTS800 for commercial applications. The engine was primarily developed for the United States Army's RAH-66 Comanche armed reconnaissance helicopter, but has also found use in commercial applications.

=== Consumer ===
The Honeywell WT6500 Wind Turbine is used for residential, commercial and agriculture electrical generation. The turbine is 170 pounds with a six-foot wide fan of magnet-tipped blades. In some states, almost 75 percent of the price of the $6,000 turbine is covered by government subsidies, which is expected to provide one-third of a household's power.

== Modern aerospace ==
=== European SESAR Program ===
Honeywell is a founding member of the European Sesar Joint Undertaking project to develop post-2020 air traffic technologies for Europe. Honeywell projects in the SESAR program include a four-dimensional (I4-D) trajectory planning system that incorporates time into 3-D route planning and coordinates flight plans to eliminate conflicts between flights. Another is a multi-constellation global navigation satellite system (GNSS) receiver that will combine multiple signals to improve reliability and accuracy for global positioning. Honeywell is also developing an airborne user interface for the European Space Agency's IRIS satellite communications system. Additionally, Honeywell is developing the SmartTraffic airborne separation assistance system (ASAS), which detects when other aircraft are too close and suggests evasive maneuvers.

=== American NextGen Program ===
In 2008 the FAA signed a $9 million agreement with Honeywell and Aviation Communications & Surveillance Systems (ACSS) to help test and install NextGen technology. In particular the FAA is pushing for Automatic Dependent Surveillance – Broadcast (ADS-B) - which broadcasts traffic and flight information to pilots and air traffic controllers.

The Federal Aviation Administration (FAA) granted $6.5 billion in contracts over 10 years under a program called Systems Engineering 2020 (SE2020). Honeywell was a part of a $1.7 billion contract with Boeing and a $280 million contract with CSSI Inc., an engineering, IT and applied research firm.

=== Avionics ===
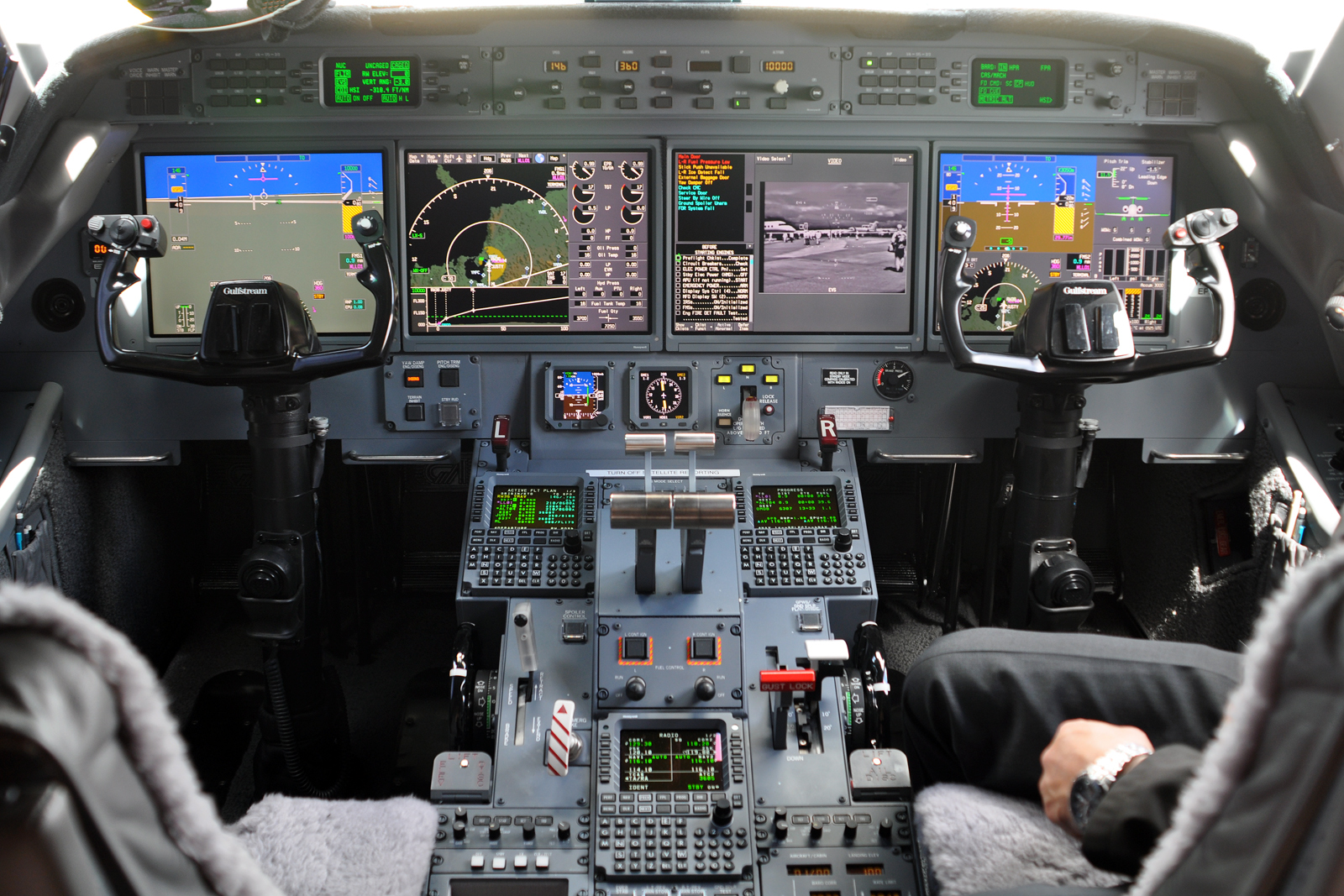
Primus Epic integrated avionics suite in a Gulfstream G550

Honeywell's Primus Electronic Flight Instrument System (EFIS) glass cockpits are installed in several aircraft, ranging from single-engine turboprop to larger regional jets.

=== Synthetic Vision ===
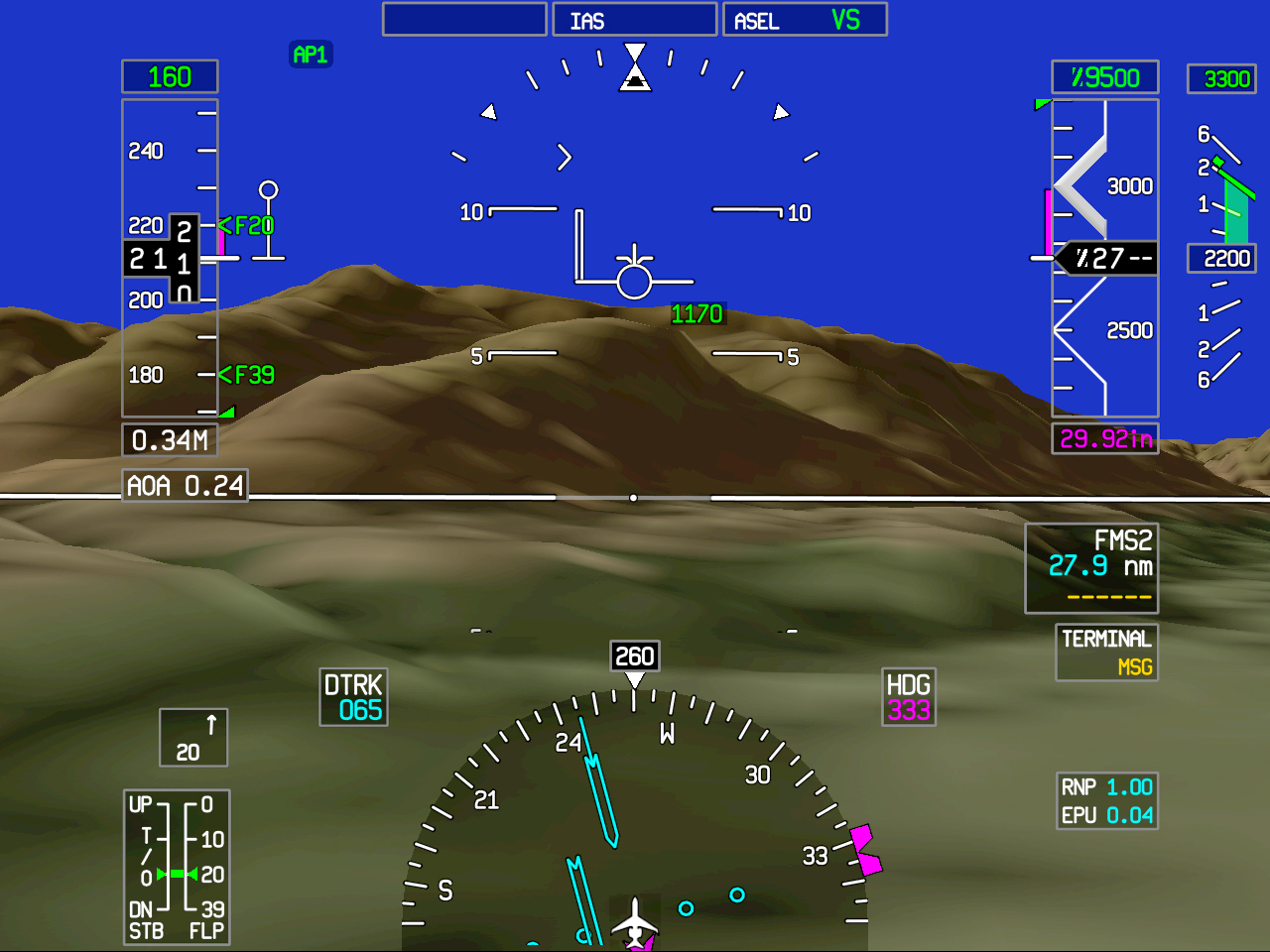
Honeywell Aerospace's synthetic vision system

By 2014, Honeywell is expected to be shipping a combined vision display (CVS) system called SmartView that overlays an enhanced vision system (EVS) onto a synthetic vision system (SVS). This gives the pilot a primary flight display that combines infrared, visual and sensor views into a single cockpit view comparable to an augmented reality view.

The system was prototyped in a lab in Phoenix, AZ, and has been tested for 25 hours of flights using Cessna and Gulfstream aircraft as test beds. Planes equipped with augmented vision can execute a straight-in Category 1 precision approach at 100 feet (30 meters) above ground, while non-augmented instrumentation requires a 200-foot fly-in.

More than 100 Honeywell synthetic vision primary flight display (SV-PFD) systems have been installed in Gulfstream aircraft since the system was certified in 2008. However the combined vision display, dubbed SmartView, is still pending certification by the Federal Aviation Administration (FAA) for its FAR 91.175 requirement. Honeywell was granted design approval for SmartPath by the FAA in 2009.

FAR 91.175 requires that a pilot decide 200 feet before landing if their ground visibility is good enough to land or whether to circle around for another try. Enhanced Vision Systems (EVS) allow them to hold off until 100–150 feet.

=== Runway safety ===
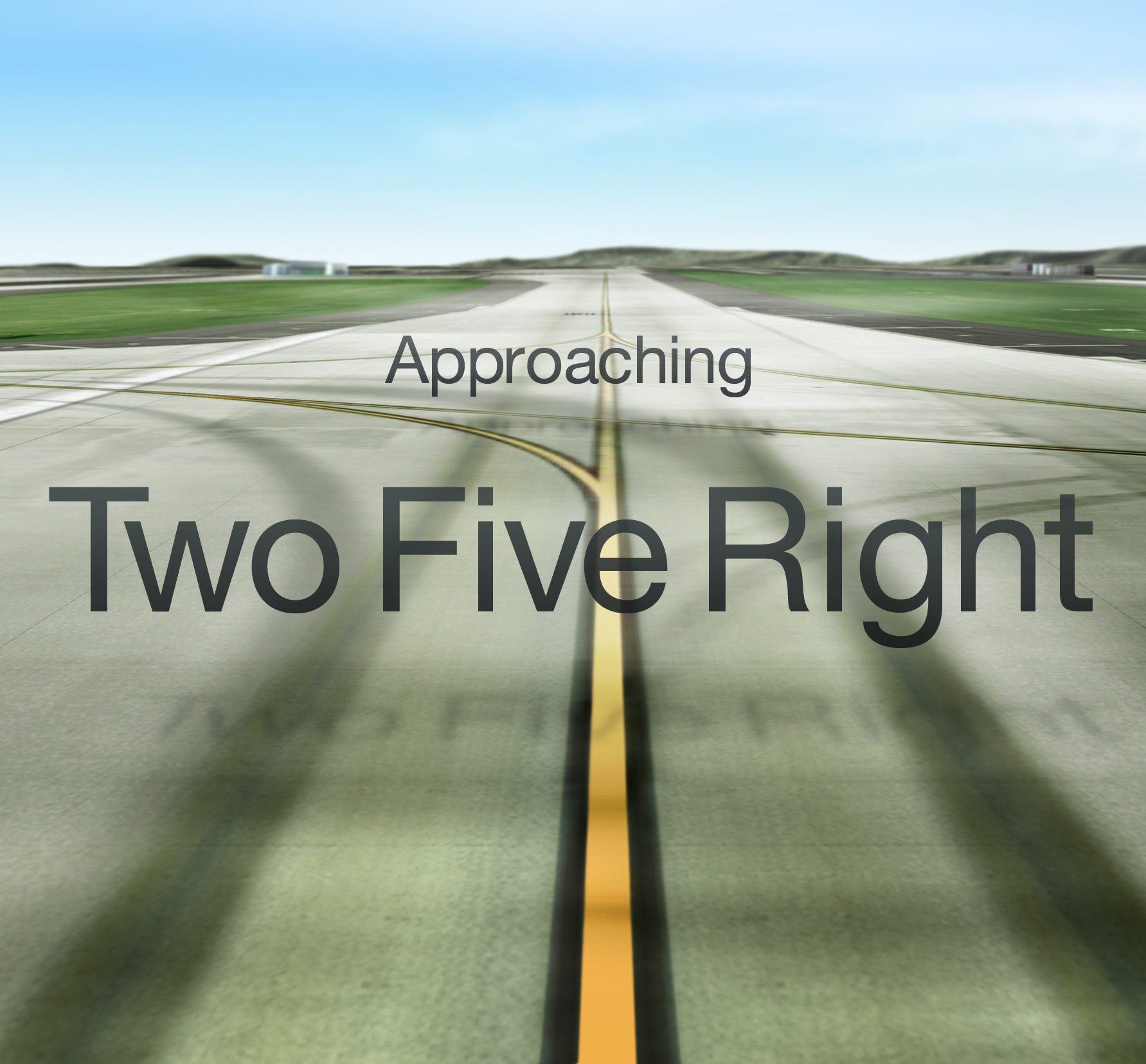
View of a runway from Honeywell's SmartRunway

Honeywell's Runway Awareness and Advisory System (RAAS) was first approved by the FAA in 2004. The basic RAAS system issues audible alerts based on an aircraft's position on the ground in respect to runways. SmartRunway and SmartLanding are added to RAAS to add audible and text alert to the horizontal situation indicator (HSI) to indicate problems like a poor landing configuration or coming in too fast. In 2009 the FAA approved the first GPS-based ground navigation service with Honeywell's Smartpath Landing System. Honeywell engineers are also developing an airport maps application that will display the plane's position on a runway map, runway and taxi navigation, show other traffic and highlight taxi route issues by air traffic control.

In early 2012 Honeywell engineer and Corporate Fellow Don Bateman was awarded the National Medal of Technology by President Obama. Bateman is the inventor or co-inventor in more than 50 US and 90 foreign patents. His group has created safety systems that have become commonplace in aviation, such as the enhanced ground proximity warning system (EGPWS), RAAS, and the stable approach monitor. They are also working on a wake turbulence encounter system as part of the NextGen initiative.

=== Weather ===
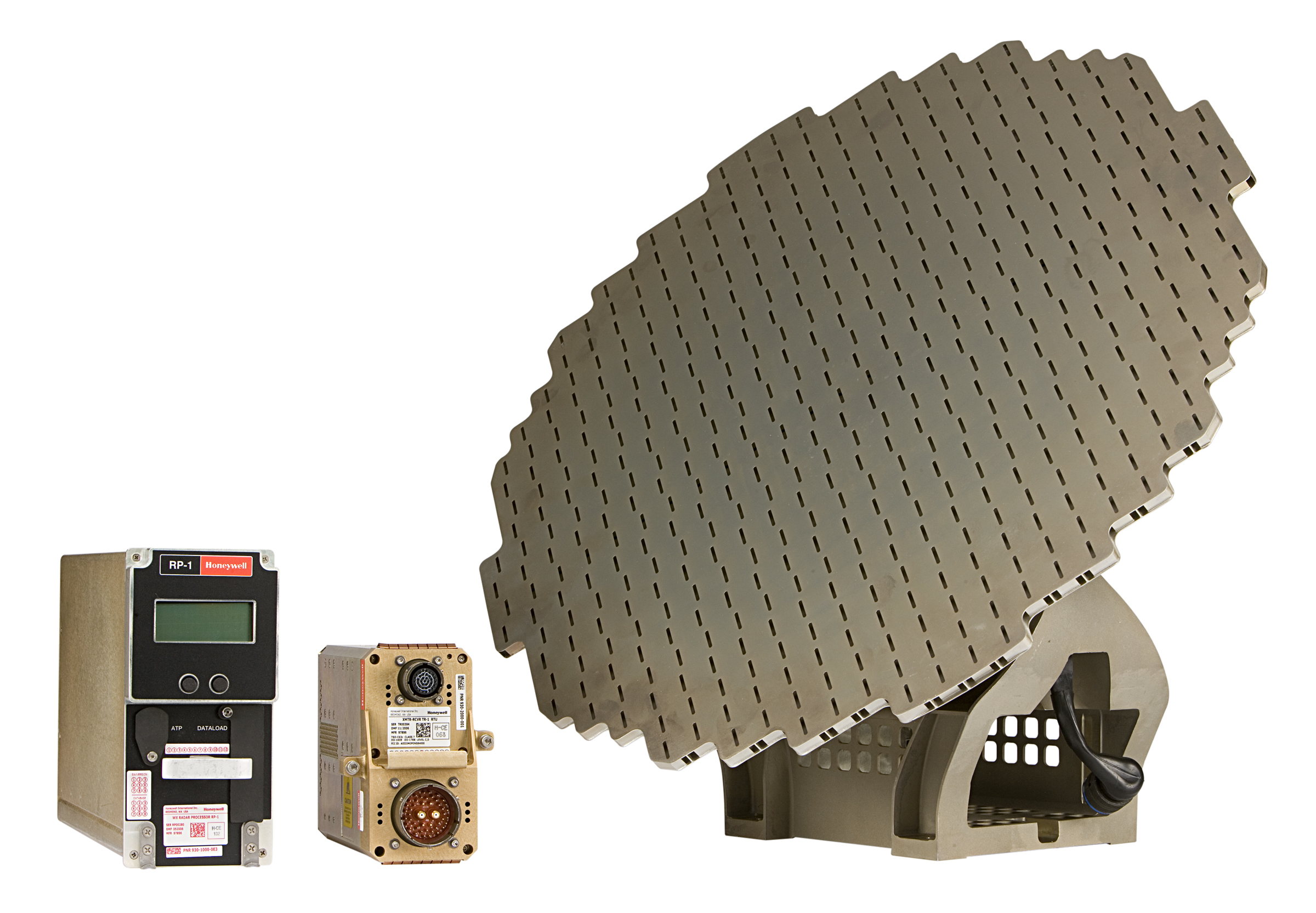
Honeywell IntuVue weather radar system

The IntuVue weather radar visualizes weather patterns up to 300 miles away. This is especially popular in Africa, India and other countries where aviation is growing, but the lack of ground support requires more in-plane instrumentation to avoid hazards.

=== Auxiliary power units ===
Auxiliary power units (APUs) are backup systems that deliver power to the engines, flight control and other avionics on an aircraft in the event the main power systems fail.

The Honeywell 131-9 APU was used in an emergency landing when U.S. Airways Flight 1549 splash landed in New York City's Hudson River on January 15, 2009, called the Miracle on the Hudson. Both CFM56 turbofans were damaged and electrical generators went off line. The pilot told the National Transportation Safety Board (NTSB) that his first command after birds flew into the turbine engines was to activate the Honeywell APU.

The 131-9 was introduced in 1991. It is standard equipment in Boeing 737NG aircraft and is in 60 percent of Airbus A320s. Newer versions are expected to be used in Comac 919 single-aisle jets, the Airbus A350 and the Bombardier CSeries narrow body line.

=== Aircraft brakes, wheels and black boxes ===
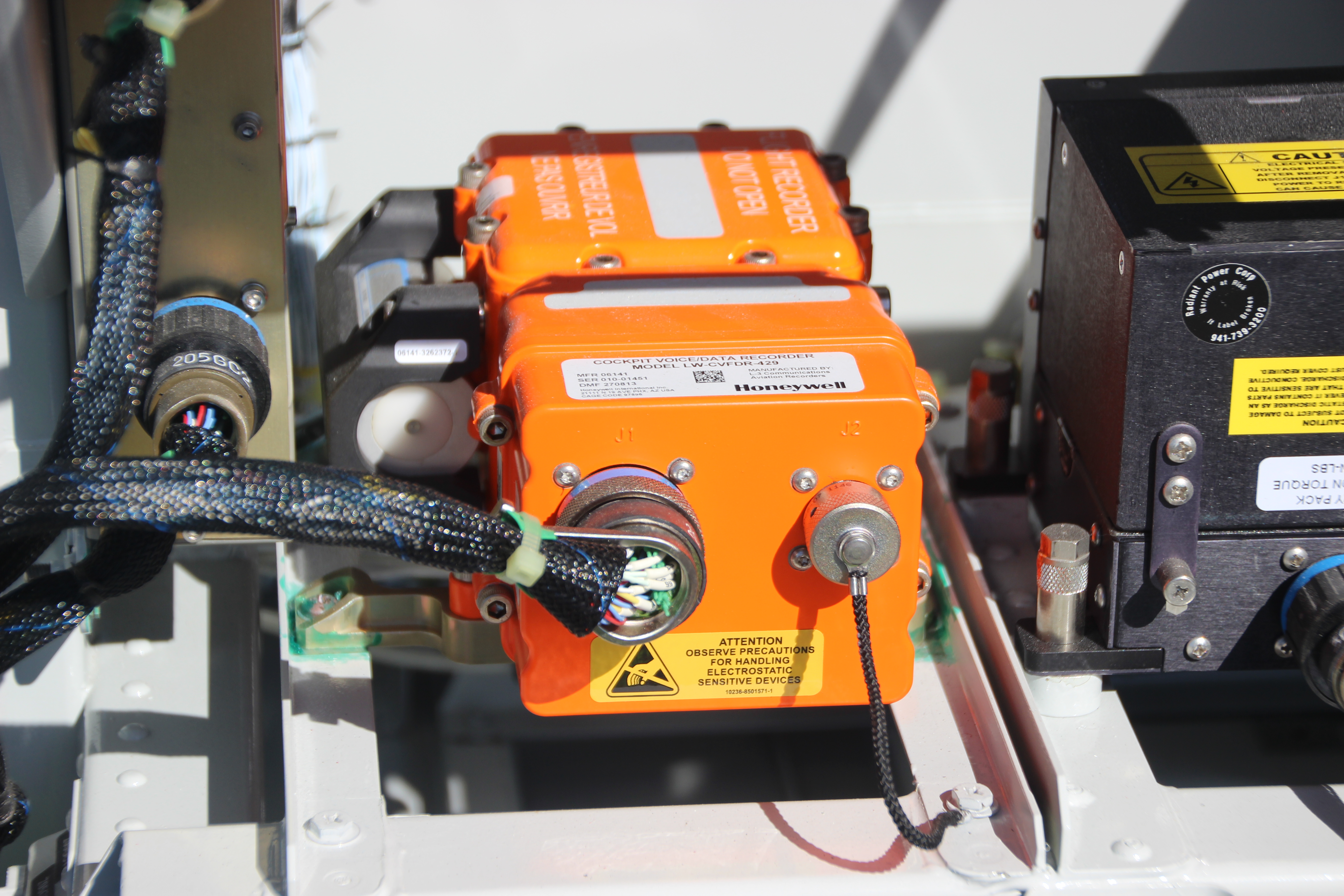
Honeywell flight data recorder

Honeywell also manufactures aircraft wheel and brake systems as part of its aircraft landing system (ALS) business based in South Bend, Indiana. It produces brakes for the joint venture between General Electric and a Chinese state-owned company called Commercial Aircraft Corporation for the C919 plane.

The project is expected to deliver 4,700 planes to China over the next 20 years. Honeywell manufactures commercial aircraft cockpit data recorders, commonly known as a "black box". In 2011 Honeywell black boxes were recovered from the infamous 2009 crash of Air France Flight 447. The black boxes were held 13,000 feet below water for two years at 400 times normal atmospheric pressure. At that depth and pressure the wireless alarm of a black box is largely ineffective and the black box itself is only designed to withstand 1500 gs of pressure or depths of 20,000 feet for 30 days. Despite far exceeding the black box's specifications, the data was recovered intact, showing the plane plummeted 38,000 feet in 3.5 minutes.

== Patents ==
Honeywell has numerous patents that relate to sensors and networks that monitor the operating condition of the plane. For example, the company has a patent for a system that measures the temperature of LED lights to determine when they are close to burning out.

Many patents have been filed related to the air traffic modernization movement. One patent covers a system of cameras where multiple cameras cover an "area of interest" and their images are processed to determine the position, direction and speed of objects in the image. A patented algorithm determines if planes will fly too close to each other at some point in their trajectory with fewer computational resources and a patented voice command system determines the phase of flight that a plane is in to determine probable voice commands and help interpret intended commands.

Honeywell also owns many patents that relate to aircraft components. A special and complex composition that prevents frost formation on windshields is patented. Honeywell has patents for turbine engines related to airflow, cooling and turbochargers and a patented secondary fuel system that is used to warm up the plane.
