= Portable collision avoidance system =

Aircraft collision avoidance system

A portable collision avoidance system (PCAS) is a proprietary aircraft collision avoidance system similar in function to traffic collision avoidance system (TCAS). TCAS is the industry standard for commercial collision avoidance systems but PCAS is gaining recognition as an effective means of collision avoidance for general aviation and is in use the world over by independent pilots in personally owned or rented light aircraft as well as by flight schools and flying clubs.

The first PCAS devices were manufactured by Zaon, and its main competitor was FLARM. Following the addition of PCAS technology to the PowerFLARM, PCAS-only units are no longer manufactured.

PCAS allows pilots, particularly in single pilot VFR aircraft, an additional instrument to increase their situational awareness of other aircraft operating nearby. A basic system will notify pilots of the nearest transponder equipped aircraft, its relative height and distance, and importantly if the distance is decreasing or increasing. More advanced systems can integrate with EFIS, overlaying nearby aircraft on the GPS map with relative height information. This information reduces pilot work loads in busy airspace. It may also help pilots to hone their ability to spot nearby aircraft by alerting them when an aircraft is near.

The original PCAS technology was developed in 1999 by Zane Hovey, a pilot and flight instructor, who also patented a portable ADS-b version as well. Through this technology, transponder-equipped aircraft are detected and ranged, and the altitude is decoded. PCAS G4 technology has advanced to the point that highly accurate range, relative altitude, and 45 degree direction can be accurately detected in a portable cockpit device. PCAS gained notoriety with the growing popular TV series The Aviators (TV series) as a sponsor, and specifically in episode 6 airing on both PBS and the Discovery Channel Network.

== Basic operation ==
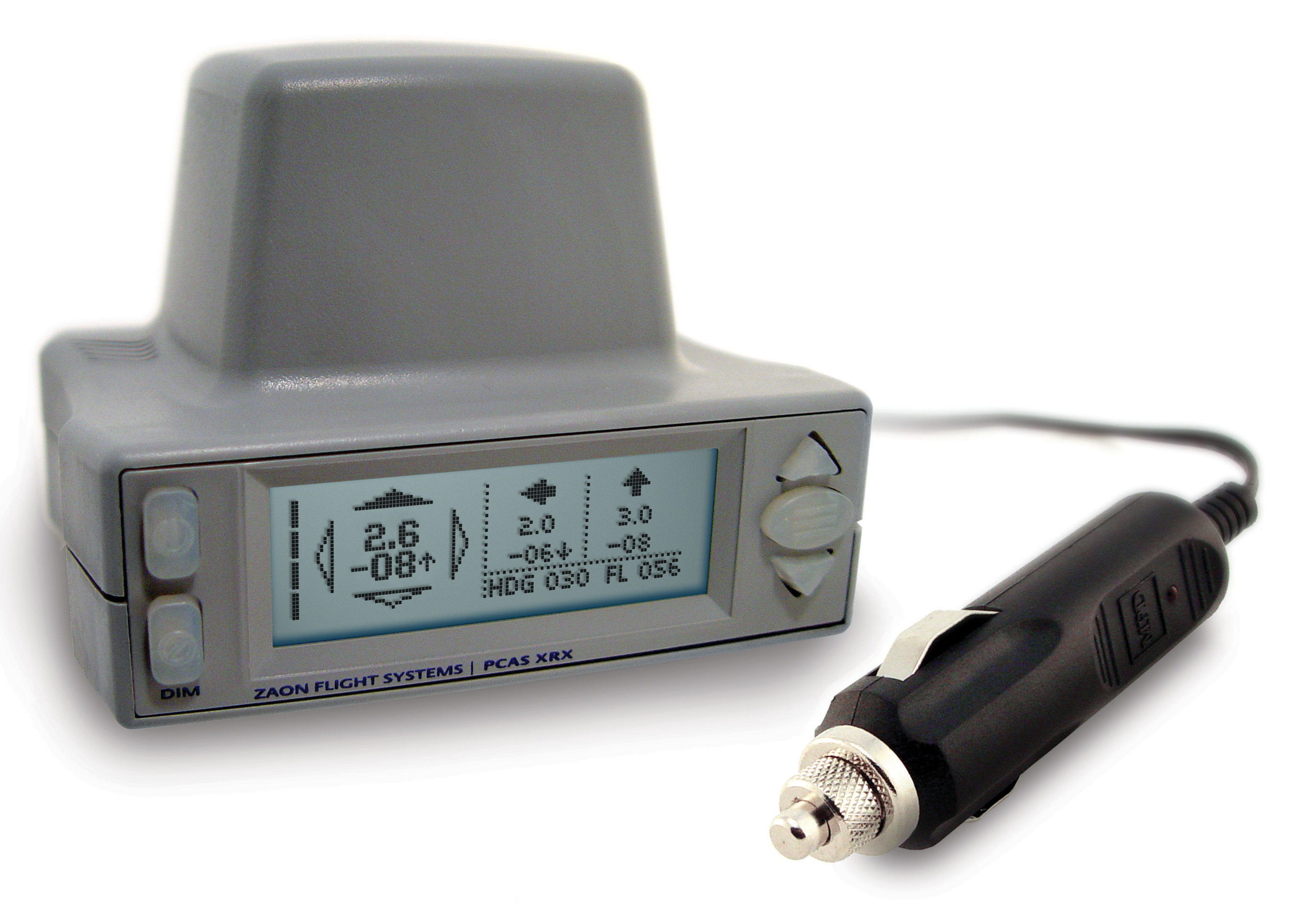
Example of a PCAS device

ATC ground stations and active TCAS systems transmit interrogation pulses on an uplink frequency of 1,030 MHz. Aircraft transponders reply on a downlink frequency of 1,090 MHz. PCAS devices detect these transponder responses, then analyze and display conflict information.

== Differences between PCAS and TCAS ==
PCAS is passive and less expensive than active aircraft detection systems, such as TCAS. TCAS operates with more precision than PCAS but is also more expensive and usually requires 'permanent' in-aircraft installation (requiring, in the United States, an FAA-approved mechanic to install). Class 2 TCAS gives mandatory instructions (called Resolution Advisories) whereas PCAS only alerts the pilot and may give a suggestion as to how to act. A very well known general aviation organization completed an evaluation of the PCAS XRX system to demonstrate the capabilities.

== Detailed operation ==
=== Step 1 ===
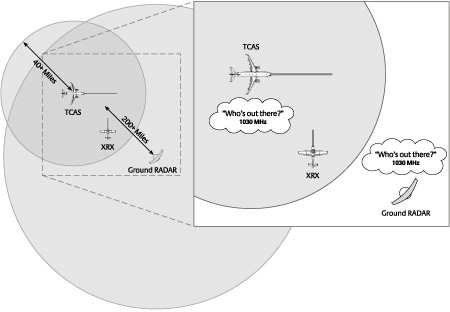
Step 1: Transponder interrogation by ground RADAR or active systems (TCAS)

An interrogation is sent out from ground-based RADAR stations and/or TCAS or other actively interrogating systems in your area. This signal is sent on 1,030 MHz. For TCAS, this interrogation range can have a radius of 40 miles from the interrogation source. The Ground RADAR range can be 200 miles or more.

=== Step 2 ===
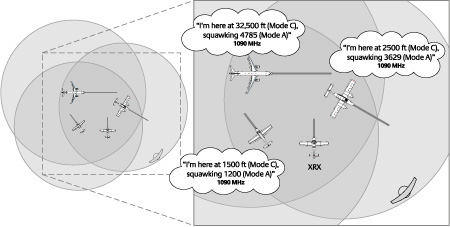
Step 2: Interrogation reply from transponder-equipped aircraft

The transponder on any aircraft within range of the interrogation replies on 1090 MHz with their squawk code (known as mode A) and altitude code (or mode C).

Mode S transponders also reply on this frequency, and encoded within the mode S transmission is the mode A (squawk) and mode C (altitude) information.

Military aircraft also respond on this frequency but use a different transmission protocol (see Step 3).

A PCAS-containing aircraft's own transponder should also reply. However, the XRX unit watches for this signal and will not report it as a threat aircraft. The unit may use this information to establish base altitude for use in step 4.

=== Step 3 ===
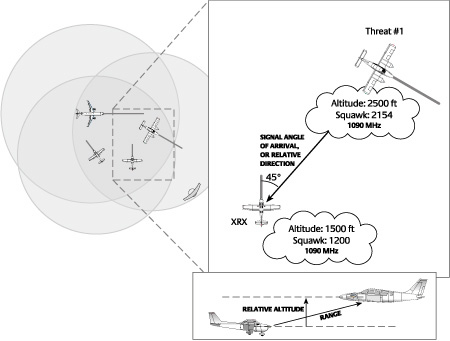
Step 3: PCAS computation of aircraft 3-axis information

The PCAS unit computes range (maximum 6 miles) based on the amplitude of the received signal, the altitude code is decoded, and the signal angle-of-arrival is determined to a resolution of "quadrants" (ahead, behind, left, or right) using a directional antenna array. XRX will recognize interrogations from TCAS, Skywatch, and any other "active" system, military protocols, and Mode S transmissions.

=== Step 4 ===
The altitude of the aircraft (in the example, 2,500 ft.) is compared to the altitude of the PCAS altitude (e.g., 1,500 ft.) and the relative altitude is calculated (e.g., 1,000 ft. above you). With relative direction, altitude and range determined, XRX displays this information and stores it in memory.

=== Step 5 ===
If additional aircraft are within detection range, the above process is repeated for each aircraft. The top threat is displayed on the left of the traffic screen and the second and third threats are displayed on the right.

The greatest threat is determined by looking at aircraft within the detection window and comparing primarily the vertical separation (± relative altitude), and secondarily the range to the aircraft currently being displayed. XRX uses algorithms to determine which of two or more aircraft is a greater threat.

== Models ==
- Zaon PCAS XRX (2016)
