= American Airlines Flight 965 =

1995 aviation accident in Colombia

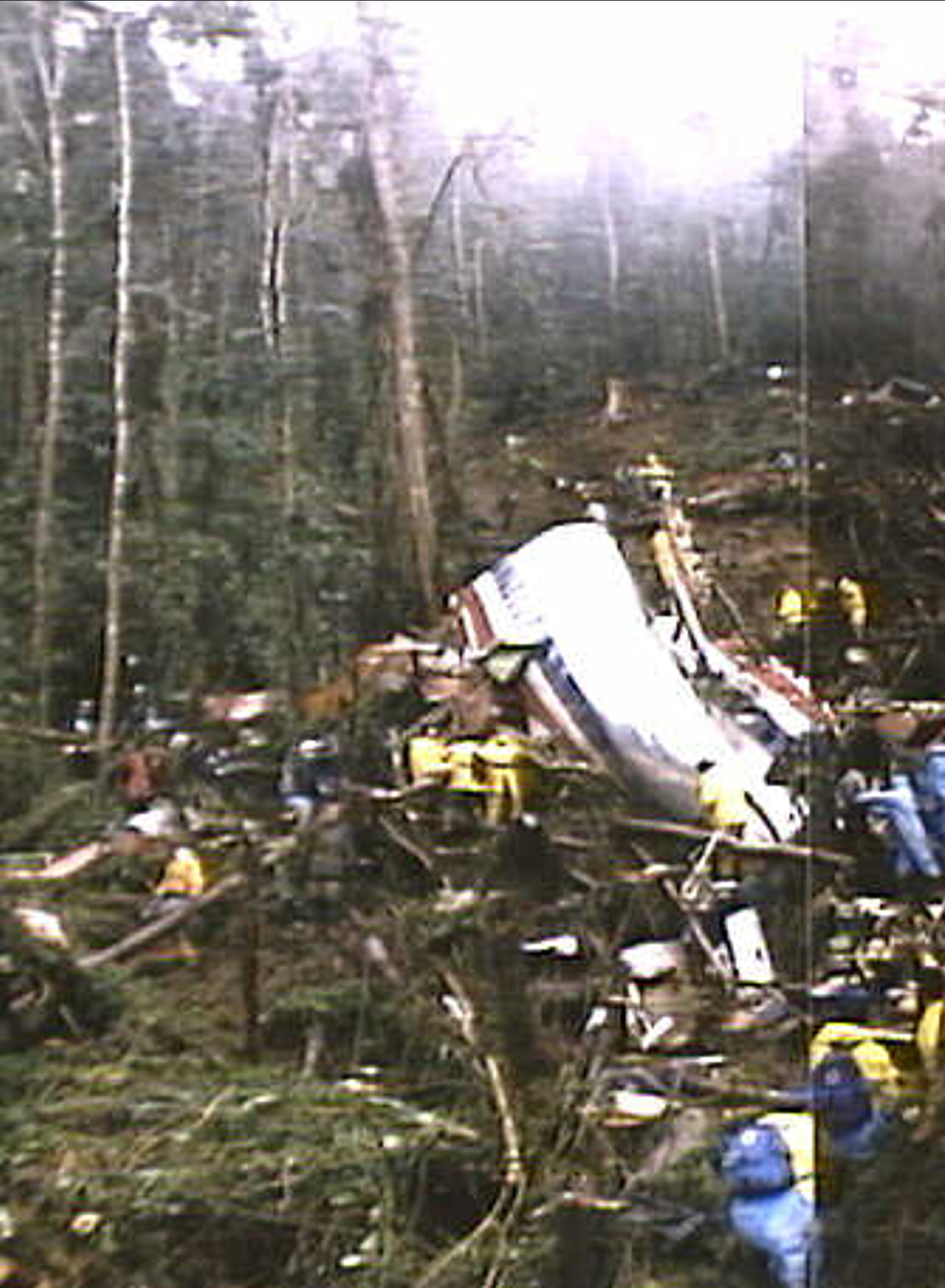
- Wreckage of the aircraft

Accident
- Date: December 20, 1995
- Summary: Controlled flight into terrain caused by navigational error due to FMS design flaws, and pilot error due to excessive workload, fatigue, loss of situational awareness, and lack of crew resource management
- Site: Guadalajara de Buga, Valle del Cauca, Colombia; 3°50′45.2″N 76°06′17.1″W

Aircraft
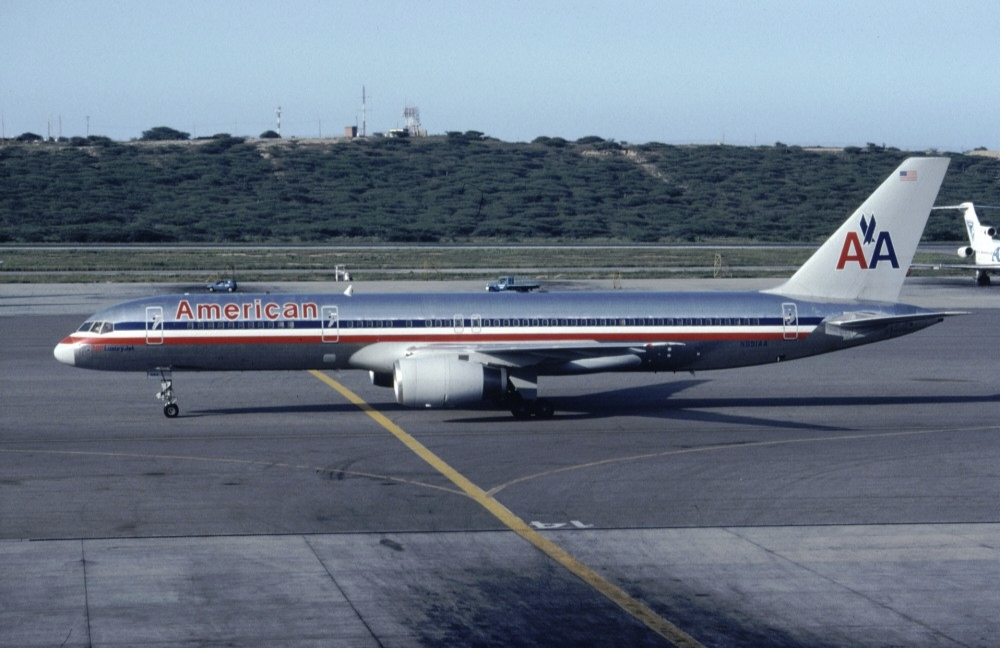
- N651AA, the aircraft involved in the accident, photographed in 1993
- Aircraft type: Boeing 757–223
- Operator: American Airlines
- IATA flight No.: AA965
- ICAO flight No.: AAL965
- Call sign: AMERICAN 965
- Registration: N651AA
- Flight origin: Miami International Airport, Florida, United States
- Destination: Alfonso Bonilla Aragón International Airport, Cali, Colombia
- Occupants: 163
- Passengers: 155
- Crew: 8
- Fatalities: 159
- Injuries: 4
- Survivors: 4

American Airlines Flight 965 was a regularly scheduled flight from Miami International Airport in Miami, Florida, to Alfonso Bonilla Aragón International Airport in Cali, Colombia. On December 20, 1995, the Boeing 757 flying this route crashed into a mountain in Buga, Colombia, around 9:40 pm local time killing 151 of the 155 passengers and all 8 crew members.

The Colombian Special Administrative Unit of Civil Aeronautics investigated the accident and determined it was caused by navigational errors by the flight crew.

== Aircraft ==
The aircraft involved in the accident was a Boeing 757–223 registered N651AA and powered by two Rolls-Royce RB211 engines.

== Crew ==
The cockpit crew consisted of Captain Nicholas Tafuri (57), and First Officer Donald "Don" Williams (39). Both pilots were considered to be highly skilled airmen. Captain Tafuri had more than 13,000 hours of flying experience (including 2,260 hours on the Boeing 757/767), and First Officer Williams had almost 6,000 hours, with 2,286 of them on the Boeing 757/767.

Captain Tafuri had flown with the United States Air Force from 1963 to 1969 and served in the Vietnam War, and joined American Airlines in 1969. First Officer Williams had flown with the US Air Force from 1979 to 1986, and joined American Airlines in 1986.

== Flight history ==
=== Departure ===
At the time, Flight 965 was mainly carrying passengers returning to Colombia for the Christmas holidays, along with vacationers and business travellers. A winter storm in the Northeastern United States caused the airline to delay the departure of the airliner for 30 minutes to allow for connecting passengers to board the flight, and seasonal congestion caused further delay. Flight 965 took off at 6:35 pm EST (23:35 UTC), nearly two hours late.

=== Going off-course ===
Cali's air traffic controllers had no functional radar to monitor the 757, as it had been blown up in 1992 by the terror group FARC. Cali's approach uses several radio beacons to guide pilots around the mountains and canyons that surround the city. The airplane's flight management system (FMS) navigation computer already had these beacons programmed in, and should have, in theory, told the pilots exactly where to turn, climb, and descend, all the way from Miami to the terminal in Cali.

Since the wind was calm, Cali's controllers asked the pilots whether they wanted to fly a non-precision straight-in approach to runway 19 rather than coming around for a precision ILS-approach to runway 01. The pilots agreed to the straight-in approach, hoping to make up some time. The pilots then mistakenly cleared all the programmed approach waypoints from the flight plan in the aircraft FMS. When the controller asked the pilots to report passing over the Tulua VOR (identified as "ULQ") north of Cali, it was no longer programmed into the FMS flight plan, so they had to find the VOR identifier "ULQ" in their approach chart. In the meantime, they extended the aircraft's speed brakes to slow it down and expedite its descent.

By the time the pilots had selected the Tulua VOR identifier "ULQ" into the FMS flight plan, they had already passed over it. The pilots then tried to select the next approach waypoint Rozo in the FMS. However, the Rozo non-directional beacon (NDB) was identified as "R" in their approach chart but not in the FMS. Instead the FMS database used a different naming convention and identified the Rozo NDB as "ROZO". Colombia had also duplicated the identifier "R" for the Romeo NDB near Bogotá 150 nmi (170 mi; 280 km) from Cali, which is not in line with the ICAO standard effective from 1978 to only duplicate identifiers if more than 600 nmi (690 mi; 1,100 km) apart. By selecting "R" from the waypoint list, the captain caused the autopilot to start flying a course to Bogotá, resulting in the airplane turning east in a wide semicircle. The pilots then attempted to correct this by turning back to the south. By the time the error was detected, the aircraft was in a valley running roughly north–south parallel to the one they should have been in. The pilots had put the aircraft on a collision course with a 3,000-meter (9,800 ft) mountain. The air traffic controller, Nelson Rivera Ramírez, believed that some of the requests of the pilots did not make sense, but did not know enough non-aviation English to convey this.

=== Crash ===
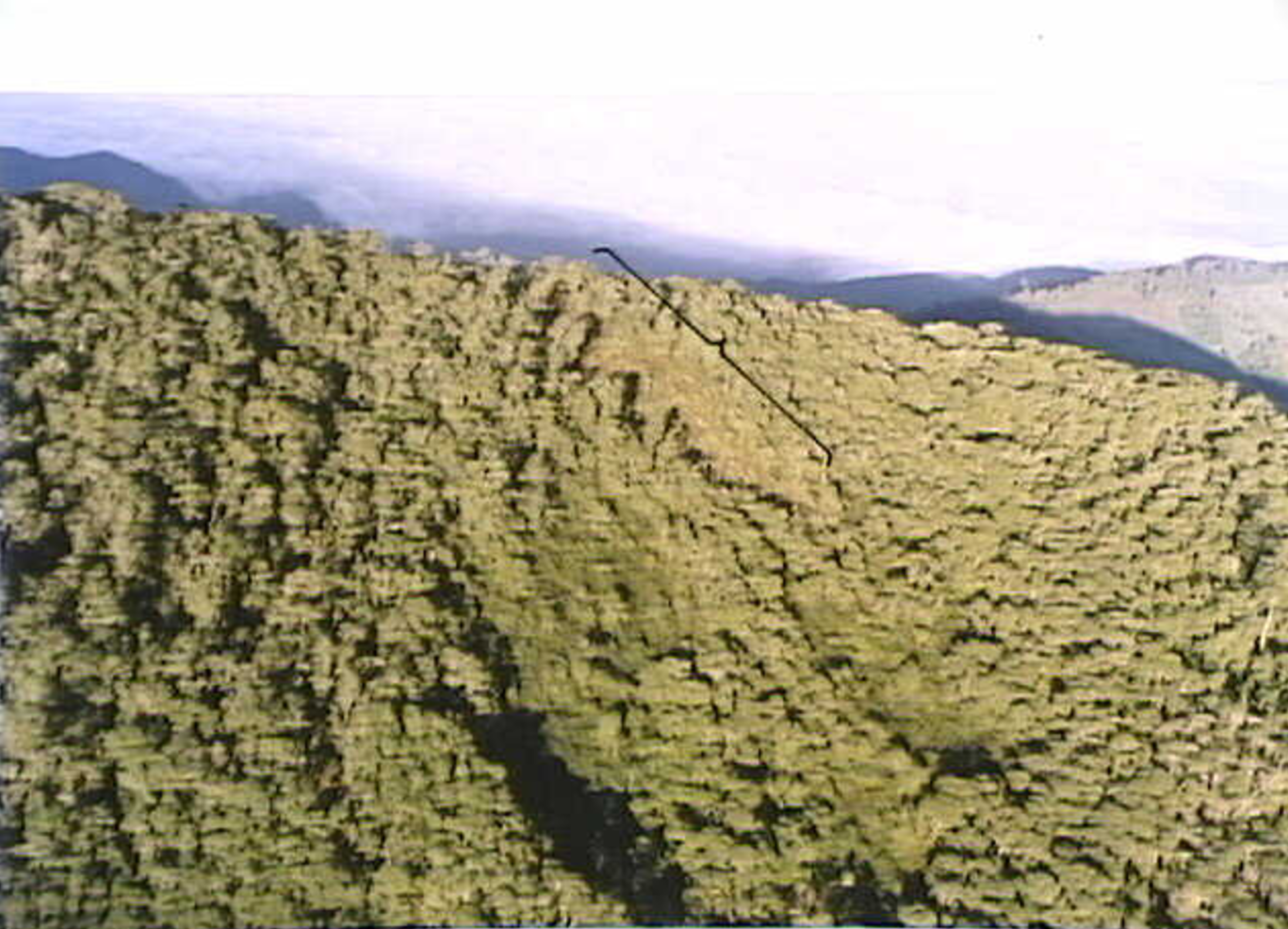
Initial impact area of the aircraft on the east face of the mountain. Most of the wreckage went over the summit and came to rest on the west face of the mountain.

Twelve seconds before the plane hit the mountain, named El Diluvio (the Deluge), the ground proximity warning system (GPWS) activated, announcing an imminent terrain collision and sounding an alarm. Within a second of this warning, the first officer disengaged the autopilot, and the captain attempted to climb clear of the mountain. Within two seconds of the warning, take-off power was selected, and in the next second, pitch was increased to 20.6° upwards, causing activation of the stick shaker. The stick shaker mechanically vibrates the control yoke (the "stick") to warn the flight crew of an imminent aerodynamic stall.

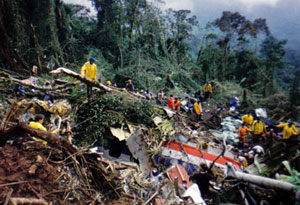
Another angle of the wreckage

When take-off power was selected, neither pilot had remembered to disengage the previously deployed speed brakes, which were fully extended and significantly reduced the rate of climb. At 9:41:28 pm EST, the aircraft struck trees at about 2,720 metres (8,920 ft) above mean sea level on the east side of the 2,700-meter-tall (9,000 ft) mountain. The last record on the flight data recorder indicated that the plane was flying at 187 knots (346 km/h; 215 mph) and with a pitch altitude of almost 28°. The crash was 9.7 km (6.0 mi; 5.2 nmi) south of Tulua VOR and 28 km (17 mi; 15 nmi) north of the approach end of runway 19 at Alfonso Bonilla Aragon International Airport. The aircraft impacted near the summit, with most of wreckage clearing the mountain and falling on the opposite side.

Five passengers, all seated within two rows of each other, survived the initial impact, but one died two days later of his injuries. In addition to the four human survivors, a dog, which had been in a carrier in the cargo hold at the time of the crash, survived the accident.

== Investigation ==
The crash was investigated by the Special Administrative Unit of Civil Aeronautics (Spanish: Aeronáutica Civil) of the Republic of Colombia, with assistance from the US National Transportation Safety Board (NTSB), as well as other parties, including the US Federal Aviation Administration, Allied Pilots Association, American Airlines, Boeing Commercial Airplane Group, and Rolls-Royce Engines.

The investigations revealed that neither the Boeing fixed-base simulator nor the flight management system simulator could be backdriven with the data obtained directly from the accident airplane's flight data recorder (FDR). Because the 757 flight simulators could not be backdriven during the tests, whether the airplane would have missed the mountain/tree tops if the speedbrakes had been retracted during the climb attempt could not be determined with precision, but the final report stated that if the flightcrew had retracted the speedbrakes one second after initiating the escape maneuver, the airplane could have been climbing through a position that was 46 m (150 ft) above the initial impact point. Because the airplane would have continued to climb and had the potential to increase its rate of climb, it might well have cleared the trees at the top of the mountain.

The Aeronáutica Civil prepared a final report of its investigation in September 1996, which was released through the US NTSB.

In its report, the Aeronáutica Civil determined these probable causes of the accident:

1. The flight crew's failure to adequately plan and execute the approach to runway 19 at SKCL and their inadequate use of automation
2. Failure of the flight crew to discontinue the approach into Cali, despite numerous cues alerting them of the inadvisability of continuing the approach
3. The lack of situational awareness of the flight crew regarding vertical navigation, proximity to terrain, and the relative location of critical radio aids
4. Failure of the flight crew to revert to basic radio navigation at the time when the flight management system-assisted navigation became confusing and demanded an excessive workload in a critical phase of the flight

In addition, the Aeronáutica Civil determined that these factors contributed to the accident:

1. The flight crew's ongoing efforts to expedite their approach and landing to avoid potential delays
2. The flight crew's execution of the ground proximity warning system escape maneuver while the speedbrakes remained deployed
3. FMS logic that dropped all intermediate fixes from the display(s) in the event of execution of a direct routing
4. FMS-generated navigational information that used a different naming convention from that published in navigational charts

The Aeronáutica Civil's report also included a variety of safety-related recommendations to the involved parties (number of individual recommendations in parentheses):

- US FAA (17)
- International Civil Aviation Organization (3)
- American Airlines (2)

Investigators later labeled the accident a nonsurvivable event, citing the impact forces and subsequent destruction of the aircraft.

== Aftermath ==
Rachel L. Swarns of The New York Times reported that within the United States, after people learned of the status of the flight, "mourning was most keenly concentrated yesterday in the larger Colombian communities" in the East Coast.

Scavengers took engine thrust reversers, cockpit avionics, and other components from the crashed 757, using Colombian military and private helicopters to go to and from the crash site. Many of the stolen components reappeared as unapproved aircraft parts on the black market in Greater Miami parts brokers. In response, the airline published a 14-page list stating all of the parts missing from the crashed aircraft. The list included the serial numbers of all of the parts.

In 1997, US District Judge Stanley Marcus ruled that the pilots had committed "willful misconduct"; the ruling applied to American Airlines, which represented the dead pilots. The judge's ruling was subsequently reversed in June 1999 by the Eleventh Circuit Court of Appeals, which also overturned the jury verdict and declared that the judge in the case was wrong in issuing a finding of fault with the pilots, a role which should have been reserved for the jury only.

American Airlines settled numerous lawsuits brought against it by the families of the victims of the accident. American Airlines filed a "third-party complaint" lawsuit for contribution against Jeppesen and Honeywell, which made the navigation computer database and failed to include the coordinates of Rozo under the identifier "R"; the case went to trial in United States District Court for the Southern District of Florida in Miami. At the trial, American Airlines admitted that it bore some legal responsibility for the accident. Honeywell and Jeppesen each contended that they had no legal responsibility for the accident. In June 2000, the jury found that Jeppesen was 30% at fault for the crash, Honeywell was 10% at fault, and American Airlines was 60% at fault.

An enhanced ground proximity warning system (EGPWS) that could have prevented the accident by providing earlier warning of impending terrain was introduced in 1996.

All US-registered turbine-powered aircraft capable of carrying more than six passengers built since 2002 are required to have an advanced terrain awareness and warning system.

As of July 2024, American Airlines continues to operate the Miami–Cali route, as American Airlines Flight 919 and American Airlines Flight 921, both operated by Boeing 737 MAX 8 aircraft.

== Notable deaths ==
- Paris Kanellakis, a computer scientist at Brown University, died with his wife and two children.
- Benny Ramírez, an insurance agent, former professional wrestler and a former National Wrestling Alliance (NWA) Texas Heavyweight Champion and NWA International Tag Team Championship, whose wrestling career spanned from 1959 to 1983. Ramírez, along with his wife and youngest daughter, were passengers on the flight. He and his wife perished in the crash. Their daughter, Mercedes, was one of the four survivors.
- Francisco Ferré Malaussena, son of former Miami mayor Maurice A. Ferré, his wife and son all perished in the crash.

The US government encountered difficulty while trying to distinguish Americans from non-Americans, as many passengers held dual citizenships.

== In popular culture ==
- The events of Flight 965 were featured in "Lost", a season-two (2005) episode of the Canadian TV series Mayday (called Air Emergency and Air Disasters in the US and Air Crash Investigation in the UK and elsewhere around the world). The episode was broadcast with the title "Crash on the Mountain" in the United Kingdom, Australia, and Asia.
- The accident was also featured on Why Planes Crash on MSNBC, in a 2015 episode titled "Sudden Impact".
- A documentary film released in 2021, American 965, directed and produced by a former British Airways captain with Fact Not Fiction Films, suggests a different possible cause for the accident.
- Outlook, a BBC World Service radio program, had an episode titled "The Father and Daughter Finding Closure After a Plane Crash", which consisted of interviews with two of the survivors of the crash.
- The accident is featured prominently in the 2011 novel The Sound of Things Falling by Colombian author Juan Gabriel Vasquez.
- In a 2022 episode of the podcast Other People's Lives, survivor Michelle Dussan is interviewed.
- It was featured as one of the instances where cockpit miscommunication correlated with an accident in the HBO's TV series The Rehearsal.

== See also ==
- Aloha IslandAir Flight 1712
- Santa Bárbara Airlines Flight 518
- Trigana Air Flight 267
