= C. Donald Bateman =

Canadian engineer and inventor (1932–2023)

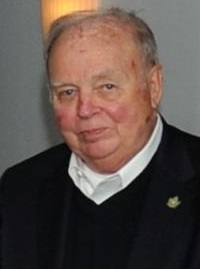
Bateman in 2012

Charles Donald Bateman (8 March 1932 – 21 May 2023), often known as Don Bateman, was a Canadian electrical engineer and the inventor of the Ground Proximity Warning System (GPWS), a device that is responsible for a marked decline in controlled flight into terrain accidents, such as the Mount Erebus disaster.

"It's accepted within the industry that Don Bateman has probably saved more lives than any single person in the history of aviation."

— Bill Vos of the Flight Safety Foundation

Bateman was born in Saskatoon, Saskatchewan on 8 March 1932. He earned his degree in electrical and electronics engineering at the University of Saskatchewan in 1956 before beginning a career at Sundstrand Corporation (later Honeywell). Bateman spent most of his career as Chief Engineer, Flight Safety Avionics at Honeywell. Over his career, he developed innovative, cost-effective avionic flight systems. His most significant accomplishment is having pioneered the invention of the original Ground Proximity Warning System (GPWS) in the late 1960s. The United States now requires the installment of GPWS for turbine aircraft which carry nine or more passengers. This technology has earned Honeywell close to a billion dollars in revenue.

Bateman retired from Honeywell on 21 July 2016. He died on 21 May 2023, at the age of 91.

== Scientific work ==
While having over 40 U.S. and 80 foreign patents concerning aircraft terrain avoidance systems, head-up displays, speed control/auto throttle systems, stall warning systems, automatic aircraft flight control systems, and weight-and-balance systems, Bateman is most recognized for his invention of the original Ground Proximity Warning System (GPWS). With his team of Honeywell Aerospace engineers, Bateman invented the original GPWS, and later improved these devices. Every five years his team "[came] up with a new model, not because the technology had improved but because we knew we could make it better." These advancements led to the creation of the Enhanced Ground Proximity Warning Systems (EGPWS). This program provides a better visualization than the GPWS did. At a glance, pilots can view a visual display of hazardous terrain below and ahead of the aircraft.

=== Ground proximity warning system (GPWS) ===
A series of aircraft crashes as a result of controlled flight into terrain (CFIT) led Bateman to take the initiative in creating a solution to these accidents. CFIT is defined as "where a pilot has the aircraft under control but unknowingly flies into terrain" This type of accident typically takes place during poor visibility. Bateman felt it was within his capabilities to construct a system that would detect hazardous terrain in the aircraft's projected path.

The Ground proximity warning system (GPWS) serves the purpose of alerting pilots if their aircraft is in danger of flying into hazardous terrain or the ground. As explained by its patent description, it does so by using a radar altimeter system to keep track of the aircraft’s height above ground and will sound an alarm if the altitude is unsafe:

"In order to provide for the additional effectiveness of a ground proximity warning system during a landing approach, the waypoint signal of an Area Navigation System is used in combination with an altitude above-ground-signal to compute a minimum terrain altitude for each point along the aircraft's approach to the runway. The minimum altitude is compared with the aircraft's actual altitude and if it is below the minimum an alarm is activated."

While this technology improved flight safety tremendously, it was still imperfect. It had two problems:

1. No Warning: The primary cause of CFIT occurrences with no GPWS warning is landing short. When the landing gear is down and landing flaps are deployed, the GPWS expects the airplane to land and therefore, issues no warning.
2. Late Warning or Improper Response: This was primarily caused by blind-spots within the terrain. A sudden change in altitude—a steep slope, for example—would receive a late warning and the pilot might be unable to avoid the obstacle. This problem was implicated in the Garuda Indonesia Flight 152 accident.

=== Enhanced GPWS ===
Bateman continued to head the development of the GPWS, developing it into the Enhanced Ground Proximity Warning Systems (EGPWS), a version that features digital terrain mapping techniques paired with three-dimensional GPS information, providing for “look-ahead” capability as well as advanced aural and visual warnings. These advancements allow for conflict predictability and improve the crew’s warning time by 20 seconds in some cases.

EGPWS also provides protection when the aircraft needs to land, keeping it from landing short or in an area without a runway. It adds an increasing terrain clearance envelope around the destination runway to prevent premature descent rates. The system’s database can predict a safe descent profile because it knows the exact runway location and elevation through database sourcing as well as latitude/longitude sensing.

== Awards ==
- Inducted into the National Inventors Hall of Fame (2005)
- Industrial Research Institute Achievement Award (2001)
- Awarded the Cumberbatch Trophy of GAPAN for a major personal contribution to the improvement of international air safety (1996)
- Awarded the National Medal of Technology and Innovation by President Barack Obama (2010)
- Awarded the Philip J. Klass Lifetime Achievement Award by Aviation Week & Space Technology magazine (2013)
- Inducted into the National Aviation Hall of Fame in Dayton, Ohio (2024)

== Patents ==
Bateman held more than 40 U.S. and 80 foreign patents concerning aircraft terrain avoidance systems, HUDs, speed control/autothrottle systems, stall warning systems, automatic flight control systems, and weight and balance systems. The earliest US 3686626 for a HUD dates to 1972 when he was with United Controls. The latest, US 008057849 for a cabin depressurization warning system, dates to 2008 with Honeywell.

The primary GPWS patent, Aircraft landing approach ground proximity warning system US 3922637 dates to 1976, with Sundstrand Data.

Abstract: “In order to provide for the additional effectiveness of a ground proximity warning system during a landing approach, the waypoint signal of an Area Navigation System is used in combination with an altitude above-ground-signal to compute a minimum terrain altitude for each point along the aircraft's approach to the runway. The minimum altitude is compared with the aircraft's actual altitude and if it is below the minimum an alarm is activated.”
