= Judy Edworthy =

Professor in the School of Psychology at the University of Plymouth

Judy Reed Edworthy is Professor of Applied Psychology, in the School of Psychology at the University of Plymouth, whose specialty is psychoacoustics and human factors. Her work has centred on auditory alarm implications throughout different areas. Her studies seek to improve auditory alarms. She is a Fellow of the Academy of Social Sciences and has collaborated with the Association for the Advancement of Medical Instrumentation (AAMI).

== Career ==
Edworthy's two main areas of research interest are the applied cognitive psychology of sound and the psychology of music. Her main interest in the field of applied psychology is the design, application and underlying theory surrounding the use of alarms in different environments. She has worked on alarm designs for vehicles such as trains and helicopters, but her main work has been on specific high-workload applications such as medical alarms in operating theatres. Here, she carries out both research and commercial design work. Her second area of research is in the cognitive psychology of music, and her current interest lies in the aesthetics of popular song, particularly the impact of complexity, repetition, and song structure on the enjoyment of popular song. She also has interests and publications in the psychology of visual warnings.

She appeared on BBC's The Code (presented by Marcus du Sautoy) in 2011. Judy illustrated the relationship between sound and mathematics, and demonstrated how our brains decipher different patterns in certain sounds.

In 2018, Edworthy appeared on the 99% Invisible podcast, featuring on the episode Mini-Stories Volume 4. She discussed the phenomenon of alarm fatigue, and how an overabundance of alarms in everyday life has affected peoples' responses to important alarms.

She has also appeared on the BBC Radio 4 programme More or Less, presented by Tim Harford. She featured on the episode "Gender pay gaps and how to learn a language" where she again discussed alarm fatigue and the effects of false alarms on how people respond to legitimate warnings, specifically about voice alarms on public transport.

In 2019, Edworthy was quoted in The New York Times article "To Reduce Hospital Noise, Researchers Create Alarms That Whistle and Sing]", in which she discussed alarm fatigue in hospital settings. The article referred to her as the "Godmother of Alarms", a title which she also uses in her Twitter bio.

In 2020, her work was recognised by the Human Factors and Ergnonomics Society, with the presentation of the Hal W Hendrick Distinguished International Colleague Award. This was on the basis of her "outstanding contributions to the human factors/ergonomics field". On receiving her award, Dr Edworthy said: "My mission has always been to combine good theoretical work on the way we listen to sound with outcomes and impacts that are meaningful and useful in the world at large".

== Work ==
=== Most notable works ===
Edworthy's most cited papers include the following:

- Edworthy J1, Loxley S, Dennis I. "Improving auditory warnings".Judy illustrated the design: relationship between warning sound parameters and perceived urgency." Hum Factors. 1991 Apr;33(2):205-31 PMID 1860703 . Cited 355 times according to Google Scholar
- Heller EJ, Edworthy J, Dennis I "Improving Auditory Warning Design: Quantifying and Predicting the Effects of Different Warning Parameters on Perceived Urgency" Human Factors December 1993 vol. 35 no. 4 693-706 doi: 10.1177/001872089303500408 Cited 157 times according to Google Scholar
- Edworthy J, Waring H "The effects of music tempo and loudness level on treadmill exercise" Ergonomics Volume 49, Issue 15, 2006 DOI:10.1080/00140130600899104 Cited 162 times according to Google Scholar

=== Recent work ===
In 2017, Dr Edworthy worked on several papers. These include:

- Edworthy, J., Reid, S., McDougall, S., Edworthy, J., Hall, S., Bennett, D., Khan, J. and Pye, E., 2017. The Recognizability and Localizability of Auditory Alarms: Setting Global Medical Device Standards. Human factors, 59(7), pp. 1108–1127.
- Stern, G., Bonafide, C., Cvach, M., Castro, G., Edworthy, J.R., Forrest, S., Funk, M., Jacques, S., Piepenbrink, J. and Strickland, S., 2017. A Roundtable Discussion: Navigating the Noise with Clinical Alarm Management. Biomedical instrumentation & technology, 51(s2), pp. 8–15.
- Hasanain, B., Boyd, A.D., Edworthy, J. and Bolton, M.L., 2017. A formal approach to discovering simultaneous additive masking between auditory medical alarms. Applied ergonomics, 58, pp. 500–514.
- Sousa, B., Donati, A., Özcan, E., van Egmond, R., Jansen, R., Edworthy, J., Peldszus, R. and Voumard, Y., 2017. Designing and deploying meaningful auditory alarms for control systems. In Space Operations: Contributions from the Global Community (pp. 255–270). Springer, Cham.
- Edworthy, J.R., Schlesinger, J.J., McNeer, R.R., Kristensen, M.S. and Bennett, C.L., 2017. Classifying alarms: Seeking durability, credibility, consistency, and simplicity. Biomedical instrumentation & technology, 51(s2), pp. 50–57.
- Edworthy, J., Kristensen, M. and Ozcan, E., 2017. Alarm fatigue in the ward.
