= Terrain awareness and warning system =

Technological equipment to prevent pilots from flying into obstacles

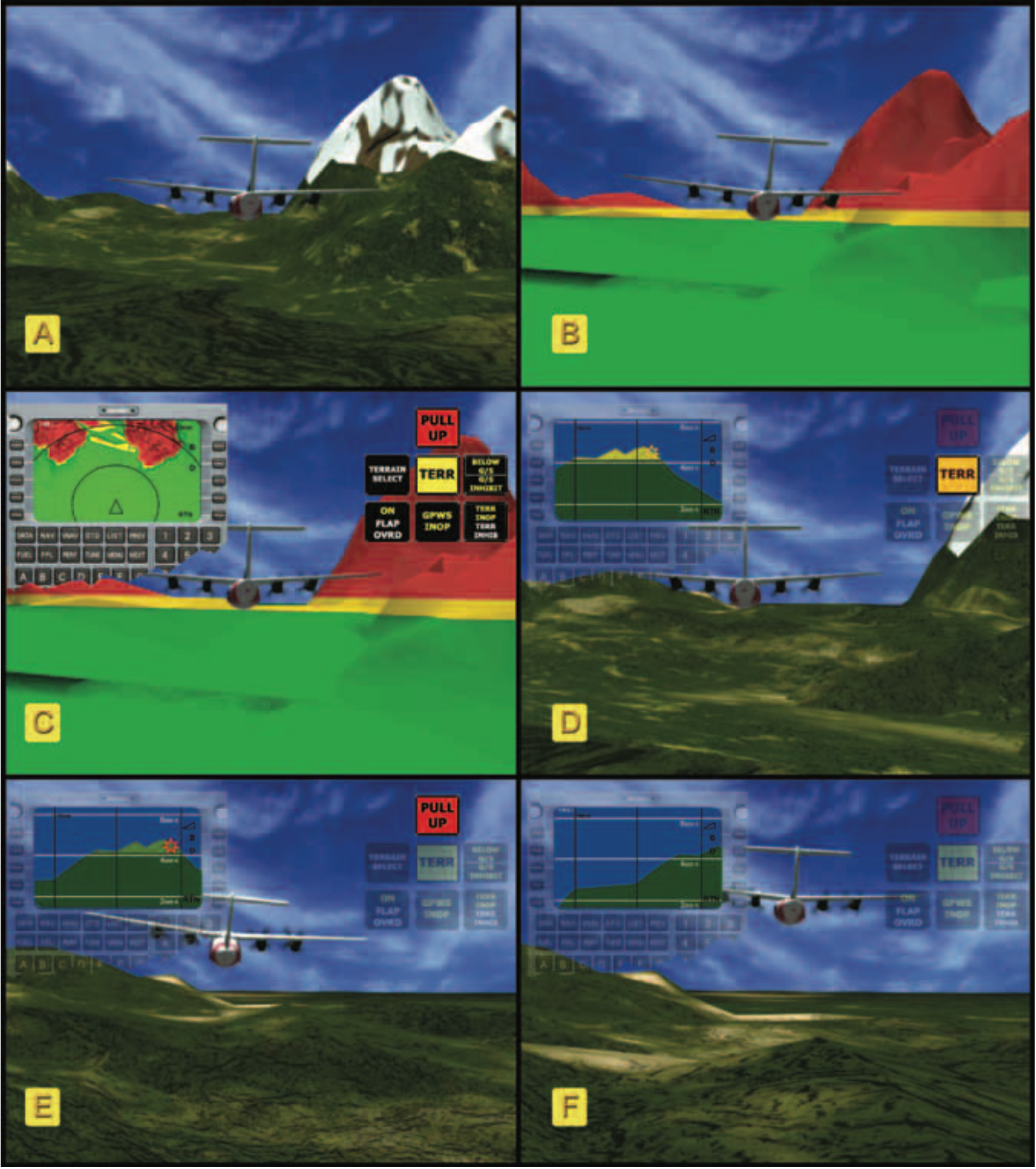
A six-frame sequence illustrating the manner in which TAWS operates. The TAWS is illustrated in an upper left window. (A) illustrates the aircraft in relation to the outside terrain while (B) and (C) illustrate the manner in which the TAWS system displays the terrain. (D) is providing a caution of terrain to be traversed, while (E) provides an illustration of a warning with an aural and textural advisory (red) to pull up. (E) also illustrates a pilot taking appropriate action (climb in this case) while (F) illustrates that a hazard is no longer a factor.

In aviation, a terrain awareness and warning system (TAWS) is generally an on-board system aimed at preventing unintentional impacts with the ground, termed "controlled flight into terrain" accidents, or CFIT. The specific systems currently in use are the ground proximity warning system (GPWS) and the enhanced ground proximity warning system (EGPWS). The U.S. Federal Aviation Administration (FAA) introduced the generic term TAWS to encompass all terrain-avoidance systems that meet the relevant FAA standards, which include GPWS, EGPWS and any future system that might replace them.

As of 2007, 5% of the world's commercial airlines still lacked a TAWS. A study by the International Air Transport Association examined 51 accidents and incidents and found that pilots did not adequately respond to a TAWS warning in 47% of cases.

Several factors can still place aircraft at risk for CFIT accidents: older TAWS systems, deactivation of the EGPWS system, or ignoring TAWS warnings when an airport is not in the TAWS database.

== History ==
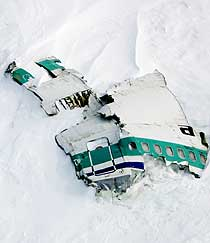
A piece of the wreckage of Air New Zealand Flight 901, which crashed in Antarctica in 1979, despite being equipped with a GPWS. All 257 people on the plane died.

Beginning in the early 1970s, a number of studies looked at the occurrence of CFIT accidents, where a properly functioning airplane under the control of a fully qualified and certificated crew is flown into terrain (or water or obstacles) with no apparent awareness on the part of the crew. In the 1960s and 70s, there was an average of one CFIT accident per month, and CFIT was the single largest cause of air travel fatalities during that time.

C. Donald Bateman, an engineer at Honeywell, is credited with developing the first ground proximity warning system (GPWS); in an early test, conducted after the 1971 crash of Alaska Airlines Flight 1866, the device provided sufficient warning for a small plane to avoid the terrain, but not enough for the larger Boeing 727 jetliner involved. Bateman's earliest devices, developed in the 1960s, used radio waves to measure altitude and triggered an alarm when the aircraft was too low, but it was not aimed forward and could not provide sufficient warning of steeply rising terrain ahead.

=== Early GPWS mandates ===
Findings from these early studies indicated that many such accidents could have been avoided if a GPWS had been used. As a result of these studies and recommendations from the U.S. National Transportation Safety Board (NTSB), in 1974 the FAA required all 14 CFR 121 (Part 121) certificate holders (that is, those operating large turbine-powered airplanes) and some 14 CFR 135 (Part 135) certificate holders (that is, those operating large turbojet airplanes) to install TSO-approved GPWS equipment.

In 1978, the FAA extended the GPWS requirement to Part 135 certificate holders operating smaller airplanes: turbojet-powered airplanes with ten or more passenger seats. These operators were required to install TSO-approved GPWS equipment or alternative ground proximity advisory systems that provide routine altitude callouts whether or not there is any imminent danger. This requirement was considered necessary because of the complexity, size, speed, and flight performance characteristics of these airplanes. The GPWS equipment was considered essential in helping the pilots of these airplanes to regain altitude quickly and avoid what could have been a CFIT accident.

Installation of GPWS or alternative FAA-approved advisory systems was not required on turbo-propeller powered (turboprop) airplanes operated under Part 135 because, at that time, the general consensus was that the performance characteristics of turboprop airplanes made them less susceptible to CFIT accidents. For example, it was thought that turboprop airplanes had a greater ability to respond quickly in situations where altitude control was inadvertently neglected, as compared to turbojet airplanes. However, later studies, including investigations by the NTSB, analyzed CFIT accidents involving turboprop airplanes and found that many of these accidents could have been avoided if GPWS equipment had been used.

Some of these studies also compared the effectiveness of the alternative ground proximity advisory system to the GPWS. GPWS was found to be superior in that it would warn only when necessary, provide maximum warning time with minimal unwanted alarms, and use command-type warnings.

Based on these reports and NTSB recommendations, in 1992 the FAA amended §135.153 to require GPWS equipment on all turbine-powered airplanes with ten or more passenger seats.

A Mode 5 warning in EGPWS alerts the pilots if they descend below the glideslope during a landing approach.

=== Evolution to EGPWS & TAWS ===
After these rules were issued, advances in terrain mapping technology permitted the development of a new type of ground proximity warning system that provides greater situational awareness for flight crews. The FAA has approved certain installations of this type of equipment, known as the enhanced ground proximity warning system (EGPWS). However, in the proposed final rule, the FAA is using the broader term "terrain awareness and warning system" (TAWS) because the FAA expects that a variety of systems may be developed in the near future that would meet the improved standards contained in the proposed final rule. The breakthrough that enabled successful EGPWS came after the dissolution of the Soviet Union in 1991; the USSR had created detailed terrain maps of the world, and Bateman convinced his director of engineering to purchase them after the political chaos made them available, enabling earlier terrain warnings.

The TAWS improves on existing GPWS systems by providing the flight crew much earlier aural and visual warning of impending terrain, forward looking capability, and continued operation in the landing configuration. These improvements provide more time for the flight crew to make smoother and gradual corrective action. United Airlines was an early adopter of the EGPWS technology. The CFIT of American Airlines Flight 965 in 1995 convinced that carrier to add EGPWS to all its aircraft; although the Boeing 757 was equipped with the earlier GPWS, the terrain warning was issued only 13 seconds before the crash.

In 1998, the FAA issued Notice No. 98-11, Terrain Awareness and Warning System, proposing that all turbine-powered U.S.-registered airplanes type certificated to have six or more passenger seats (exclusive of pilot and copilot seating), be equipped with an FAA-approved terrain awareness and warning system.

On March 23, 2000, the FAA issued Amendments 91–263, 121–273, and 135-75 (Correction 135.154). These amendments amended the operating rules to require that all U.S. registered turbine-powered airplanes with six or more passenger seats (exclusive of pilot and copilot seating) be equipped with an FAA-approved TAWS. The mandate only affects aircraft manufactured after March 29, 2002.

By 2006, aircraft upset accidents had overtaken CFIT as the leading cause of aircraft accident fatalities, credited to the widespread deployment of TAWS. On March 7, 2006, the NTSB called on the FAA to require all U.S.-registered turbine-powered helicopters certified to carry at least 6 passengers to be equipped with a terrain awareness and warning system. The technology had not yet been developed for the unique flight characteristics of helicopters in 2000. A fatal helicopter crash in the Gulf of Mexico, involving an Era Aviation Sikorsky S-76A++ helicopter with two pilots transporting eight oil service personnel, was one of many crashes that prompted the decision.

President Barack Obama awarded the National Medal of Technology and Innovation to Bateman in 2010 for his invention of GPWS and its later evolution into EGPWS/TAWS.

== Workings ==
A modern TAWS works by using digital elevation data and airplane instrumental values to predict if a likely future position of the aircraft intersects with the ground. The flight crew is thus provided with "earlier aural and visual warning of impending terrain, forward looking capability, and continued operation in the landing configuration."

== TAWS types ==
The FAA specifications have detailed requirements for when certain warnings should sound in the cockpit.

Class A TAWS includes all the requirements of Class B TAWS, below, and adds the following additional three alerts and display requirements of:

- Excessive closure rate to terrain alert
- Flight into terrain when not in landing configuration alert
- Excessive downward deviation from an ILS glideslope alert
- Required: Class A TAWS installations shall provide a terrain awareness display that shows either the surrounding terrain or obstacles relative to the airplane, or both.

Class B TAWS is defined by the U.S. FAA as: A class of equipment that is defined in TSO-C151b and RTCA DO-161A. As a minimum, it will provide alerts for the following circumstances:

- Reduced required terrain clearance
- Imminent terrain impact
- Premature descent
- Excessive rates of descent
- Negative climb rate or altitude loss after takeoff
- Descent of the airplane to 500 feet above the terrain or nearest runway elevation (voice callout "Five Hundred") during a non-precision approach.
- Optional: Class B TAWS installation may provide a terrain awareness display that shows either the surrounding terrain or obstacles relative to the airplane, or both.

Class C defines voluntary equipment intended for small general aviation airplanes that are not required to install Class B equipment. This includes minimum operational performance standards intended for piston-powered and turbine-powered airplanes, when configured with fewer than six passenger seats, excluding any pilot seats. Class C TAWS equipment shall meet all the requirements of a Class B TAWS with the small aircraft modifications described by the FAA. The FAA has developed Class C to make voluntary TAWS usage easier for small aircraft.

== Effects and statistics ==
Prior to the development of GPWS, large passenger aircraft were involved in 3.5 fatal CFIT accidents per year, falling to 2 per year in the mid-1970s. A 2006 report stated that from 1974, when the U.S. FAA made it a requirement for large aircraft to carry such equipment, until the time of the report, there had not been a single passenger fatality in a CFIT crash by a large jet in U.S. airspace.

After 1974, there were still some CFIT accidents that GPWS was unable to help prevent, due to the "blind spot" of those early GPWS systems. More advanced systems were developed.

Older TAWS, or deactivation of the EGPWS, or ignoring its warnings when airport is not in its database, still leave aircraft vulnerable to possible CFIT incidents. In April 2010, a Polish Air Force Tupolev Tu-154M aircraft crashed near Smolensk, Russia, in a possible CFIT accident killing all passengers and crew, including the Polish President. The aircraft was equipped with TAWS made by Universal Avionics Systems of Tucson. According to the Russian Interstate Aviation Committee TAWS was turned on. However, the airport where the aircraft was going to land (Smolensk (XUBS)) is not in the TAWS database. In January 2008 a Polish Air Force Casa C-295M crashed in a CFIT accident near Mirosławiec, Poland, despite being equipped with EGPWS; the investigation found the EGPWS warning sounds had been disabled, and the pilot-in-command was not properly trained with EGPWS.

== See also ==
- Index of aviation articles
- List of aviation, avionics, aerospace and aeronautical abbreviations
- Airborne collision avoidance system
- Controlled flight into terrain (CFIT)
- Digital fly-by-wire
- Ground proximity warning system / enhanced GPWS
- Runway Awareness and Advisory System
