= Airborne collision avoidance system =

Avionics system to avoid aircraft collision

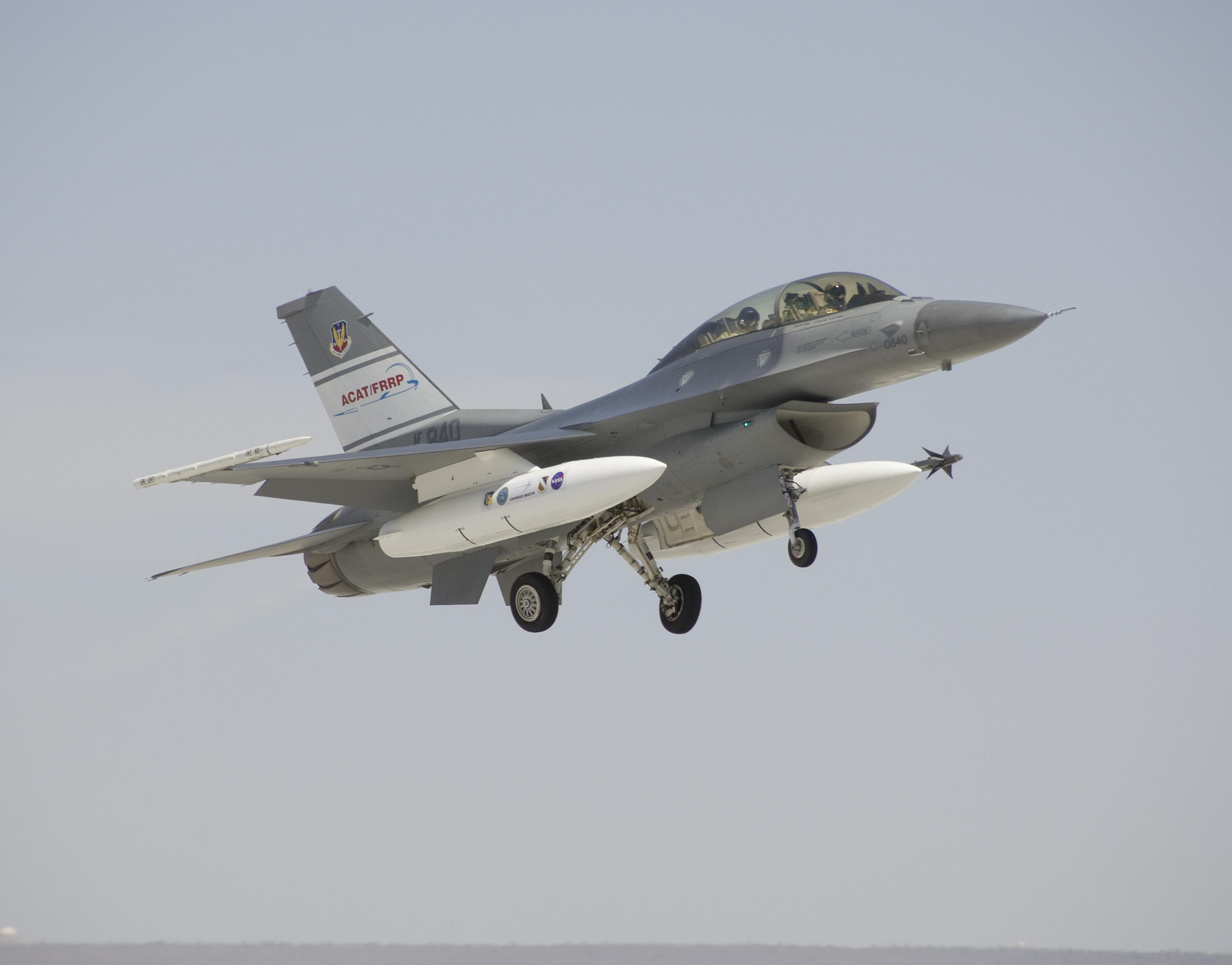
The U.S. Air Force's F-16D Ground Collision Avoidance Technology (GCAT) aircraft

An airborne collision avoidance system (ACAS; usually /ˈeɪkæs/ AY-kas) operates independently of ground-based equipment and air traffic control in warning pilots of the presence of other aircraft that may present a threat of collision. If the risk of collision is imminent, the system recommends a maneuver that will reduce the risk of collision. ACAS standards and recommended practices are mainly defined in Annex 10, Volume IV, of the Convention on International Civil Aviation. Much of the technology being applied to both military and general aviation today has been undergoing development by NASA and other partners since the 1980s.

A distinction is increasingly being made between ACAS and ASAS (airborne separation assurance system). ACAS is being used to describe short-range systems intended to prevent actual metal-on-metal collisions. In contrast, ASAS is being used to describe longer-range systems used to maintain standard en route separation between aircraft (5 nautical miles (9.3 km) horizontal and 1,000 feet (300 m) vertical).

== TCAS ==
As of 2022, the only implementations that meets the ACAS II standards set by ICAO are Versions 7.0 and 7.1 of TCAS II (Traffic Collision Avoidance System) produced by Garmin, Rockwell Collins, Honeywell and ACSS (Aviation Communication & Surveillance Systems – a joint-venture between Acron Aviation and Thales).

As of 1973, the United States Federal Aviation Administration (FAA) standard for transponder minimal operational performance, Technical Standard Order (TSO) C74c, contained errors which caused compatibility problems with air traffic control radar beacon system (ATCRBS) radar and Traffic Collision Avoidance System (TCAS) abilities to detect aircraft transponders. First called "The Terra Problem", there have since been individual FAA Airworthiness Directives issued against various transponder manufacturers in an attempt to repair the operational deficiencies, to enable newer radars and TCAS systems to operate. Unfortunately, the defect is in the TSO, and the individual corrective actions to transponders have led to significant differences in the logical behavior of transponders by make and mark, as proven by an FAA study of in-situ transponders. In 2009, a new version, TSO C74d was defined with tighter technical requirements.

AIS-P (ACAS) is a modification which both corrects the transponder deficiencies (the transponder will respond to all varieties of radar and TCAS), then adds an Automatic Independent Surveillance with Privacy augmentation. The AIS-P protocol does not suffer from the saturation issue in high density traffic, does not interfere with the Air Traffic Control (ATC) radar system or TCAS, and conforms to the internationally approved Mode S data packet standard. It awaits member country submission to the ICAO as a requested approval.

== Other collision avoidance systems ==
Modern aircraft can use several types of collision avoidance systems to prevent unintentional contact with other aircraft, obstacles, or the ground.

=== Aircraft collision avoidance ===
Some of the systems are designed to avoid collisions with other aircraft and UAVs. They are referred to as "electronic conspicuity" by the UK CAA.

- Airborne radar can detect the relative location of other aircraft, and has been in military use since World War II, when it was introduced to help night fighters (such as the de Havilland Mosquito and Messerschmitt Bf 110) locate bombers. While larger civil aircraft carry weather radar, sensitive anti-collision radar is rare in non-military aircraft.
- Traffic collision avoidance system (TCAS), the implementation of ACAS, actively interrogates the transponders of other aircraft and negotiates collision-avoidance tactics with them in case of a threat. TCAS systems are relatively expensive, and tend to appear only on larger aircraft. They are effective in avoiding collisions only with other aircraft that are equipped with functioning transponders with altitude reporting.
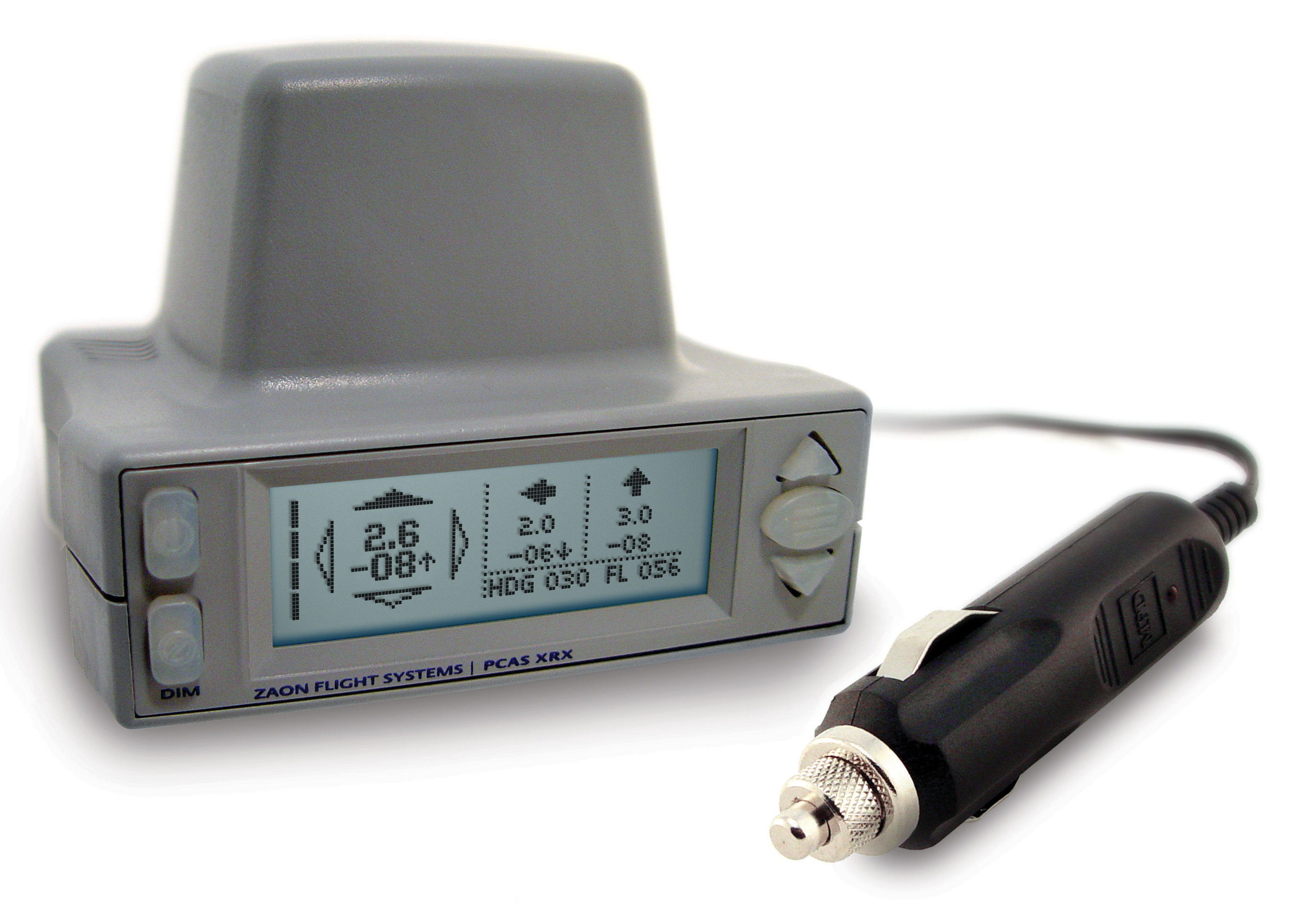
- Small PCAS device for use in light aircraft.
  a Portable Collision Avoidance System (PCAS) is a less expensive, passive version of TCAS designed for general aviation use. PCAS systems do not actively interrogate the transponders of other aircraft, but listen passively to responses from other interrogations. PCAS is subject to the same limitations as TCAS, although the cost for PCAS is significantly less.
- FLARM is a small-size, low-power device (commonly used in gliders or other light aircraft) which broadcasts its own position and speed vector (as obtained with an integrated GPS) over a license-free ISM band radio transmission. At the same time it listens to other devices based on the same standard. Intelligent motion prediction algorithms predict short-term conflicts and warn the pilot accordingly by acoustical and visual means. FLARM incorporates a high-precision WAAS 16-channel GPS receiver and an integrated low-power radio transceiver. Static obstacles are included in FLARM's database. No warning is given if an aircraft does not contain an additional FLARM device.

=== Terrain collision avoidance ===
- a Ground proximity warning system (GPWS), or Ground collision warning system (GCWS), which uses a radar altimeter to detect proximity to the ground or unusual descent rates. GPWS is common on civil airliners and larger general aviation aircraft.
- a Terrain awareness and warning system (TAWS) uses a digital terrain map, together with position information from a navigation system such as GPS, to predict whether the aircraft's current flight path could put it in conflict with obstacles such as mountains or high towers, that would not be detected by GPWS (which uses the ground elevation directly beneath the aircraft). One of the best examples of this type of technology is the Auto-GCAS (Automatic Ground Collision Avoidance System) and PARS (Pilot Activated Recovery System) that was installed on the entire USAF fleet of F-16's in 2014.
- Synthetic vision provides pilots with a computer-generated simulation of their outside environment for use in low or zero-visibility situations. Information used to present warnings is often taken from GPS, INS, or gyroscopic sensors.

== See also ==
- Acronyms and abbreviations in avionics
- Air traffic control
- Automatic dependent surveillance – broadcast
- Avionics
- Collision avoidance
