= Ground proximity warning system =

Alert system meant to prevent pilots from flying or taxiing into obstacles

A diagram showing two aircraft paths, the lower of which would trigger GPWS

A ground proximity warning system (GPWS) is a system designed to alert pilots if their aircraft is in immediate danger of flying into the ground or an obstacle. The United States Federal Aviation Administration (FAA) defines GPWS as a type of terrain awareness and warning system (TAWS). More advanced systems, introduced in 1996, are known as enhanced ground proximity warning systems (EGPWS), a modern type of TAWS.

== History ==
In the late 1960s, a series of controlled flight into terrain (CFIT) accidents took the lives of hundreds of people. A CFIT accident is one where a properly functioning airplane under the control of a fully qualified and certified crew is flown into terrain, water or obstacles with no apparent awareness on the part of the crew.

Beginning in the early 1970s, a number of studies examined the occurrence of CFIT accidents. Findings from these studies indicated that many such accidents could have been avoided if a warning device called a ground proximity warning system (GPWS) had been used. As a result of these studies and recommendations from the U.S. National Transportation Safety Board (NTSB), in 1974, the FAA required all large turbine and turbojet airplanes to install TSO-approved GPWS equipment.

The UN International Civil Aviation Organization (ICAO), recommended the installation of GPWS in 1979.

C. Donald Bateman, a Canadian-born engineer, developed and is credited with the invention of GPWS.

In March 2000, the U.S. FAA amended operating rules to require that all U.S. registered turbine-powered airplanes with six or more passenger seats (exclusive of pilot and copilot seating) be equipped with an FAA-approved TAWS. The mandate affects aircraft manufactured after March 29, 2002.

== Effects and statistics ==
Prior to the development of GPWS, large passenger aircraft were involved in 3.5 fatal CFIT accidents per year, falling to 2 per year in the mid-1970s. A 2006 report stated that from 1974, when the U.S. FAA made it a requirement for large aircraft to carry such equipment, until the time of the report, there had not been a single passenger fatality in a CFIT crash by a large jet in U.S. airspace.

After 1974, there were still some CFIT accidents that GPWS was unable to help prevent, due to the "blind spot" of those early GPWS systems. More advanced systems were developed.

Older TAWS, or deactivation of the EGPWS, or ignoring its warnings when an airport is not in its database, still leave aircraft vulnerable to possible CFIT incidents. In April 2010, a Polish Air Force Tupolev Tu-154M aircraft crashed near Smolensk, Russia, in a possible CFIT accident killing all passengers and crew, including the President of Poland Lech Kaczyński. The aircraft was equipped with TAWS made by Universal Avionics Systems of Tucson. According to the Russian Interstate Aviation Committee, the TAWS was turned on. However, the airport where the aircraft was going to land (Smolensk (XUBS)) was not in the TAWS database. In January 2008 a Polish Air Force Casa C-295M crashed in a CFIT accident near Mirosławiec, Poland, despite being equipped with EGPWS; the EGPWS warning sounds had been disabled, and the pilot-in-command was not properly trained with EGPWS.

== Commercial aircraft ==
The FAA specifications have detailed requirements for when certain warnings should sound in the cockpit.

The system monitors an aircraft's height above ground as determined by a radar altimeter. A computer then keeps track of these readings, calculates trends, and will warn the flight crew with visual and audio messages if the aircraft is in certain defined flying configurations ("modes").

The modes are:

1. Excessive descent rate ("SINK RATE" "PULL UP") (Note: On older GPWS, a noise often referred to as a "whoop" may sound twice before the "PULL UP" aural warning.)
2. Excessive terrain closure rate ("TERRAIN" "PULL UP")
3. Excessive large obstacle closure rate ("OBSTACLE" "PULL UP")
4. Altitude loss after takeoff or with a high power setting ("DON'T SINK")
5. Unsafe terrain clearance ("TOO LOW – TERRAIN" "TOO LOW – GEAR" "TOO LOW – FLAPS")
6. Excessive deviation below glideslope ("GLIDESLOPE")
7. Excessively steep bank angle ("BANK ANGLE")
8. Windshear protection ("WINDSHEAR")

The traditional GPWS does have a blind spot. Since it can only gather data from directly below the aircraft, it must predict future terrain features. If there is a dramatic change in terrain, such as a steep slope, GPWS will not detect the aircraft closure rate until it is too late for evasive action.

In the late 1990s, improvements were developed and the system is now named "Enhanced Ground Proximity Warning System" (EGPWS/TAWS). The system is combined with a worldwide digital terrain database and relies on Global Positioning System (GPS) technology. On-board computers compare current location with a database of the Earth's terrain. The Terrain Display gives pilots a visual orientation to high and low points near the aircraft. These improvements allow the system to provide earlier warnings to pilots when approaching terrain conflicts.

EGPWS software improvements are focused on solving two common problems: no warning at all, and late or improper response.

=== No warning ===
The primary cause of CFIT occurrences with no GPWS warning is landing short. When the landing gear is down and landing flaps are deployed, the GPWS expects the airplane to land and therefore, issues no warning. EGPWS introduces the Terrain Clearance Floor (TCF) function, which provides GPWS protection even in the landing configuration.

=== Late warning or improper response ===
The occurrence of a GPWS alert typically happens at a time of high workload and nearly always surprises the flight crew. Almost certainly, the aircraft is not where the pilot thinks it should be, and the response to a GPWS warning can be late in these circumstances. Warning time can also be short if the aircraft is flying into steep terrain since the downward-looking radio altimeter is the primary sensor used for the warning calculation. The EGPWS improves terrain awareness and warning times by introducing the Terrain Display and the Terrain Data Base Look Ahead protection.

== Incidents ==
In commercial and airline operations, there are legally mandated procedures that must be followed should an EGPWS caution or warning occur. Both pilots must respond and act accordingly once the alert has been issued. In Indonesia, the captain of Garuda Indonesia Flight 200 was charged with manslaughter for not adhering to these procedures.

In 2015, Air France Flight 953 (a Boeing 777-200ER aircraft) avoided controlled flight into terrain after the EGPWS detected Mount Cameroon in the aircraft's flight path. The pilot flying immediately responded to the initial warning from the EGPWS.

== General aviation ==
TAWS equipment is not required by the U.S. FAA in piston-engined aircraft, but optional equipment categorised as TAWS Type C may be installed. Depending on the type of operation, TAWS is only required to be installed into turbine-powered aircraft with six or more passenger seats.

A smaller and less expensive version of EGPWS was developed by AlliedSignal (now merged with Honeywell) for general aviation and private aircraft.

== Fast military aircraft ==
For fast military aircraft, the high speed and low altitude that may frequently be flown make traditional GPWS systems unsuitable, as the blind spot becomes the critical part. Thus, an enhanced system is required, taking inputs not only from the radar altimeter, but also from inertial navigation system (INS), Global Positioning System (GPS), and flight control system (FCS), using these to accurately predict the flight path of the aircraft up to 5 nautical miles (9.3 km) ahead. Digital maps of terrain and obstacle features are then used to determine whether a collision is likely if the aircraft does not pull up at a given pre-set g-level. If a collision is predicted, a cockpit warning may be provided. This is the type of system deployed on aircraft such as the Eurofighter Typhoon. The U.S. FAA has also conducted a study about adapting 3-D military thrust vectoring to recover civil jetliners from catastrophes.

On May 5, 2016, a military GPWS called Automatic Ground Collision Avoidance System (Auto-GCAS) equipped aboard an F-16 was activated after a trainee pilot lost consciousness from excessive G forces during basic fighter manoeuvre training. In an approximately 55 degree nose down attitude at 8,760 ft (2,670 m) and a speed of 750 mph (1,210 km/h), the Auto-GCAS detected that the aircraft was going to strike the terrain and executed an automatic recovery, saving the pilot's life.

== See also ==
- Acronyms and abbreviations in avionics
- Air New Zealand Flight 901
- Airborne collision avoidance systems (ACAS)
- Airport surveillance and broadcast systems
- American Airlines Flight 965
- Ansett New Zealand Flight 703, a CFIT accident associated with GPWS malfunction
- Fly-by-wire control systems
- Santa Barbara Airlines Flight 518
- South African Airways Flight 228
- TERPROM
- Traffic Collision Avoidance System (TCAS)
- TWA Flight 514
- Voice warning system
