= Technical Standard Order =

A Technical Standard Order (TSO) is a minimum performance standard issued by the United States Federal Aviation Administration for specified materials, parts, processes, and appliances used on civil aircraft. Articles with TSO design approval are eligible for use on United States type certified products by following a much lighter process than similar non-TSO approved parts, provided the TSO standard meets the aircraft requirements. The TSO authorization (also called TSOA) or a letter of TSO Design Approval does not necessarily convey approval for installation.

Similar standards are maintained by other aviation authorities. For example European Technical Standard Orders (ETSO) by EASA for the European Union, with limited reciprocal equivalence on a per-country basis. These often have the same numbers as FAA TSOs. For example, the FAA TSO for aviation headsets is C139. In the European Union, it is ETSO-C139.

== See also ==
- Type certificate
- Supplemental type certificate
