= Supeno Surija =

Indonesian writer, scientist and inventor

- Born: 1961 (age 64–65)
- Known for: “Dioxin-Free System” for preservation of the environment.
- Awards: MURI award for “Dioxin-Free System”(2008); MURI award for “Ganoderma Vaccine for basal stem rot disease” (2016)
- Scientific career
- Fields: Microbiology; Nanotechnology
- Workplaces: National Geographic Society; Institute of Nanotechnology; Microbiology Society; American Institute of Aeronautics and Astronautics

Supeno Surija (born 1961; Medan, Indonesia) is an Indonesian writer, scientist, inventor and economic and environmental professional.

== Background ==
Surija earned master's and Ph.D. degrees and is a member of the American Institute of Aeronautics and Astronautics. In 2000, Surija became an active environmental activist and pioneer of Zero Burning in many plantations in Indonesia. In 2008, he established Buah Nabar Conservation in Sibolangit, North Sumatra, Indonesia. Surija had completed CPD (Continuing Professional Development) from distinguished universities, namely: RNA-seq data analysis from Harvard University, Antimicrobial Stewardship from Stanford University and University of Dundee, Developing New Drugs from Texas University, Extremes Microbes from Kyoto University, Astrophysics from Australian National University, Astrobiology from the University of Copenhagen, Energy Development from University of Liverpool and Monitoring Climate from Space from European Space Agency.

== Biotechnology ==
Surija began his career in biology since he was in senior high school.

In 1994, he began his research on Dioxin-Free in the prevention of cancer, diabetes, infertility, and DNA damage by implementing the Dioxin-Free system for the production, packaging, distribution, and consumption processes. As he continued his research, he successfully completed his research and invention which was written in the book Dioxin-Free System. This invention has received many world awards, including an award from MURI (Indonesia World Records Museum) as the first dioxin-free system in the world.

In 1998, he started his research on agriculture and organic palm plantation. Through the root analysis and nanoparticle implementation, he successfully produced more efficient organic fertilizers at a lower cost and increased production significantly, unlike the failure of the previous generation of organic fertilizers for perennials (especially oil palm).

In 2008, he established PT. Propadu Konair Tarahubun, a subsidiary of Plantation Key Technology Group which is the acronym for Proyek Terpadu Konservasi Air, Tanah, Udara, Hutan, dan Perkebunan (Integrated Project for Water, Earth, Air, Forests Conservation, and Plantations) as plantation professional and producer of organic fertilizers, biopesticides, bioherbicides. The implementation of nanotechnology is the foundation of the success of PT Propadu Konair Tarahubun (Plantation Key Technology/ PKT) as the pioneer of organic oil palm plant and CPO around the world and in Indonesia.

He is the first person in the world to invent a vaccine for Ganoderma disease in oil palm plantations.

PKT is also the only company recognized by many parties for its success in preventing and handling the basal stem rot disease Ganoderma in oil palm plantations.

== Awards ==
- 1996 – IBC Award, 2000 Outstanding People of the 20th Century, Various Research, Cambridge, England.
- 1997 – World Who's Who, Marquis, USA
- 1998 – IBC Award, 20th Century Award for Achievement, Various Research, Cambridge, England.
- 2000 – World Who's Who in Finance Industry, Marquis, USA.
- 2005 – IBC Award, International Professional of the year 2005, Dioxin-Free® System Invention, Cambridge, England.
- 2008 – “Dioxin-Free System” for the preservation of the environment for the invention and contribution of dioxin-free to the world from Indonesia World Records Museum (MURI).
- 2016 – MURI award for Ganoderma Vaccine for basal stem rot disease.

== Publications ==
- Surija, Supeno; Bastian, Roderick (15 April 2020). "The Effectiviness of Organic Method for Increasing the Productivity of Oil Palm That Is Infected by Ganoderma". Journal of Agricultural Science. 12 (5): 180. doi:10.5539/jas.v12n5p180. S2CID 216184040.
- Bastian, Roderick; Surija, Supeno; Faustine, Michelle (15 June 2021). "The Effectiveness Colonized System of Ganoderma Vaccine Compared to Trichoderma on Oil Palm Plantations That Infected by Ganoderma boninense". Journal of Agricultural Science. 13 (7): 89. doi:10.5539/JAS.V13N7P89. S2CID 236258927.
