= Pancur Batu, Deli Serdang =

Coordinates: 3°30′0″N 98°34′0″E

Pancur Batu is a sub-district in Deli Serdang Regency, North Sumatra, Indonesia.

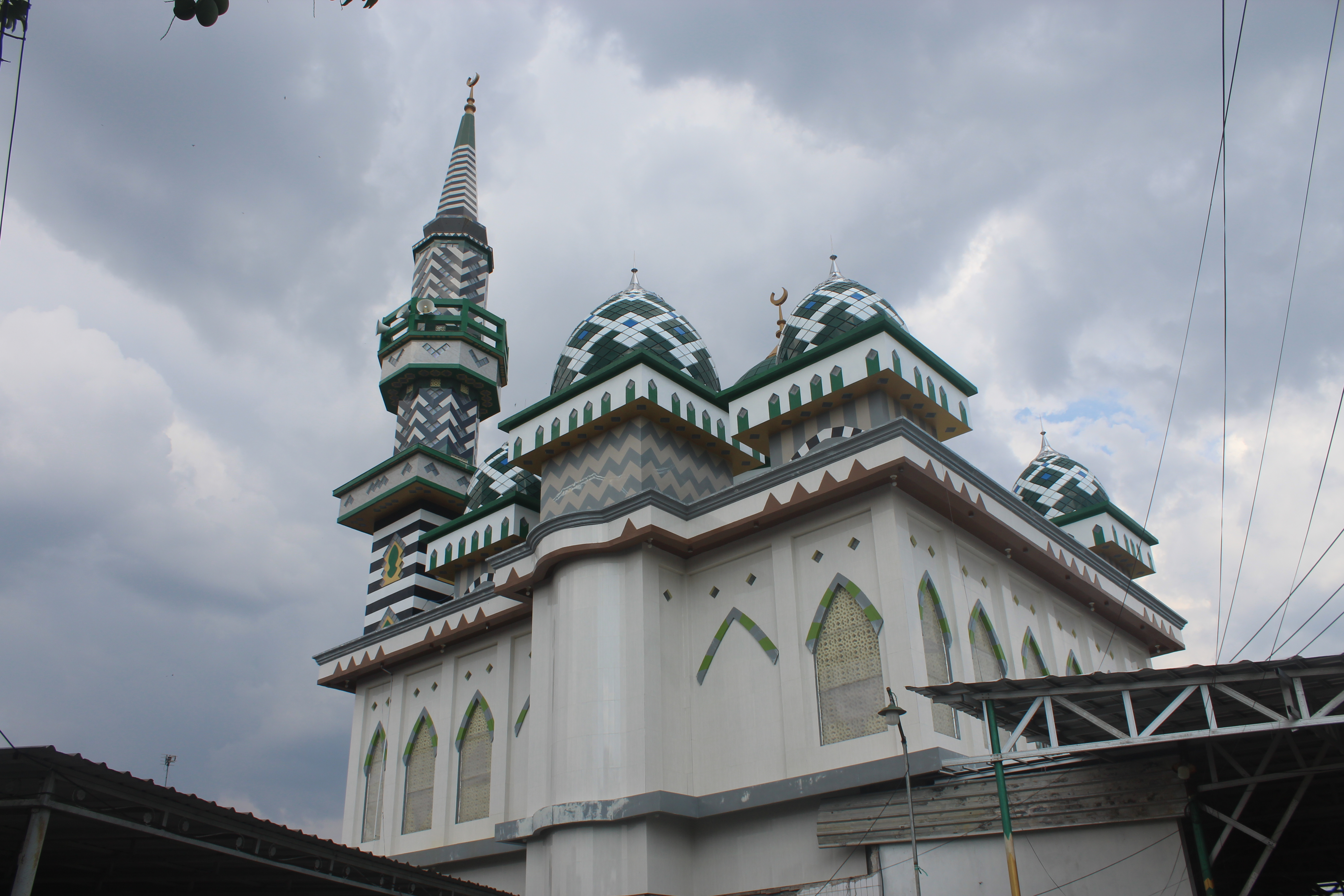
Mosque in Pancur Batu

== Air disaster ==
On September 26, 1997, Garuda Indonesia Flight 152 crashed in the sub-district, killing all 234 people on board. It is the deadliest aviation disaster to occur in Indonesia.
