= PKT =

PKT may refer to:

- Propadu Konair Tarahubun, fertilizer manufacturer, Indonesia
- Park Street railway station, England, National Rail station code
- PKT machine gun
- Pakistan Standard Time
- Bontang PKT, Indonesian football team
- Port Keats Airfield, IATA airport code "PKT"
