= 1994 Fairchild Air Force Base B-52 crash =

1994 military aviation accident in the state of Washington, United States

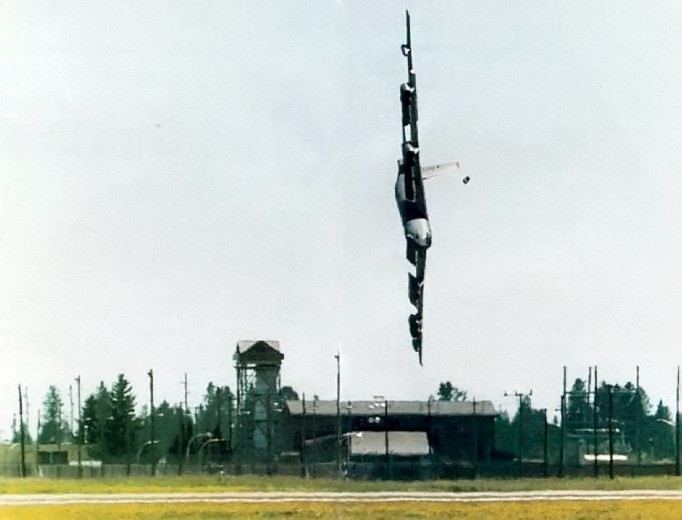
- 61-0026, callsign Czar 52, a fraction of a second before crashing. The copilot McGeehan's escape hatch, jettisoned during his attempt to eject, can be seen near the tip of the vertical stabilizer

Accident
- Date: June 24, 1994
- Summary: Pilot error, stall
- Site: Fairchild Air Force Base, Washington, U.S.; 47.6105°N 117.6505°W

Aircraft
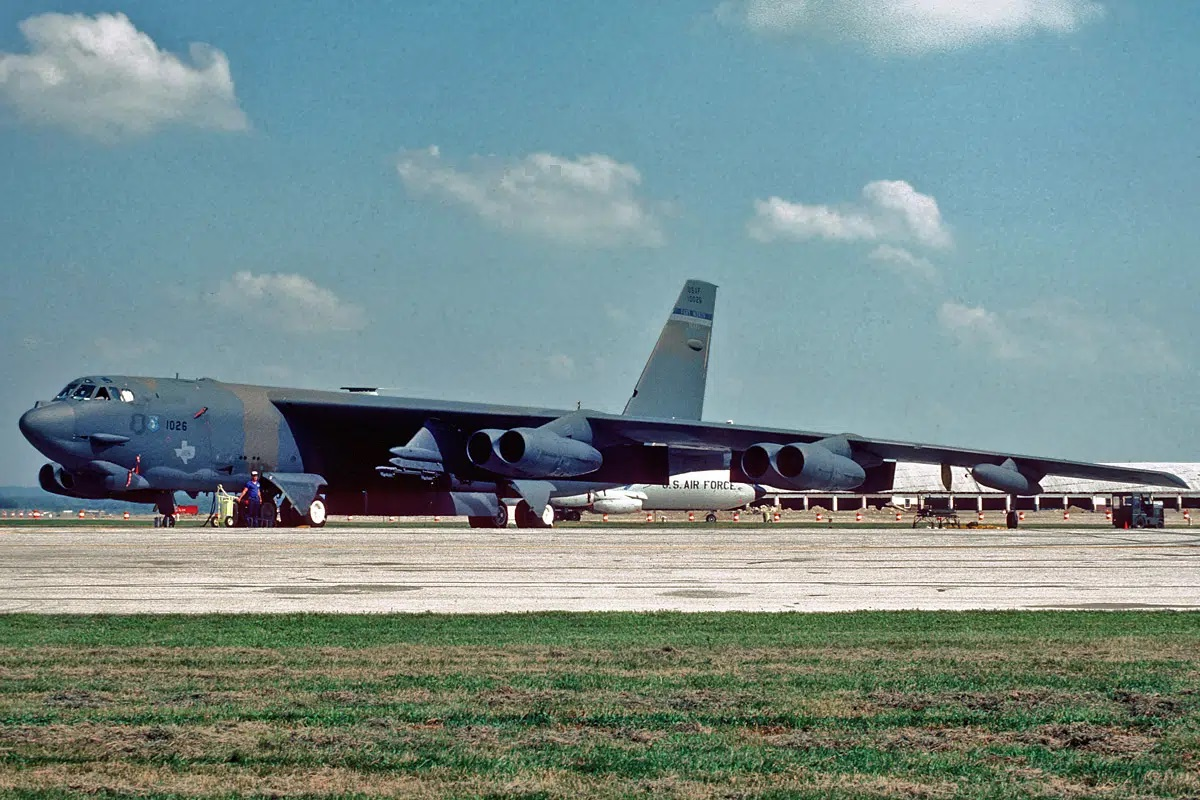
- 61-0026, the B-52H involved in the accident
- Aircraft type: Boeing B-52H Stratofortress
- Operator: United States Air Force
- Call sign: Czar 52
- Registration: 61-0026
- Occupants: 4
- Crew: 4
- Fatalities: 4
- Survivors: 0

On Friday, June 24, 1994, a United States Air Force (USAF) Boeing B-52H Stratofortress strategic bomber crashed at Fairchild Air Force Base, Washington, United States, after its pilot, Lieutenant Colonel Arthur "Bud" Holland, maneuvered the bomber beyond its operational limits and lost control. The aircraft stalled, fell to the ground and exploded, killing Holland and the other three crew aboard. The crash was captured on video and was shown repeatedly on news broadcasts throughout the world.

The subsequent investigation concluded that the crash was attributable primarily to three factors: Holland's personality and behavior, USAF leaders' delayed or inadequate reactions to earlier incidents involving Holland, and the sequence of events during the aircraft's final flight. The crash is now used in military and civilian aviation environments as a case study in teaching crew resource management. It is also often used by the U.S. Armed Forces during aviation safety training as an example of the importance of compliance with safety regulations and correcting the behavior of anyone who violates safety procedures.

== Crash ==
At 07:30 local time (PDT) on June 24, 1994, a United States Air Force (USAF) B-52H bomber crew stationed at Fairchild Air Force Base prepared to practice an aircraft demonstration flight for an airshow. The crew consisted of pilots Lieutenant Colonel Arthur "Bud" Holland (age 46), Lt Col Mark McGeehan (38), Colonel Robert Wolff (46), and weapon systems officer/radar navigator Lt Col Ken Huston (41). Holland was the designated aircraft commander for the flight. McGeehan was the copilot and Wolff was present as a safety observer. Holland was the chief of the 92nd Bomb Wing's Standardization and Evaluation branch, McGeehan was the commander of the 325th Bomb Squadron, Wolff was the vice commander of the 92nd Bomb Wing, and Huston was the 325th Bomb Squadron's operations officer. Holland, as chief of standardization and evaluation, was responsible for the knowledge and enforcement of academic and in-flight standards for the bomb wing's flying operations.

The mission plan for the flight called for a demanding series of low-altitude passes, 60° banked turns, a steep climb, and a touch-and-go landing on Fairchild's runway 23. The flight was also Wolff's "finis flight" – a common tradition in which a retiring USAF aircrew member is met shortly after landing on their final flight at the airfield by relatives, friends and coworkers, and doused with water. Thus, Wolff's wife and many of his close friends were at the airfield to watch the flight and participate in the post-flight ceremony. McGeehan's wife and two youngest sons watched the flight from the backyard of McGeehan's living quarters, located nearby.

The B-52 aircraft, callsign Czar 52, took off at 13:58 and completed most of the mission's elements without incident. Upon preparing to execute the touch-and-go on Runway 23 at the end of the practice profile, the aircraft was instructed to go around because a KC-135 aircraft had just landed and was on the runway. Maintaining an altitude of about 250 feet (75 m) above ground level (AGL), Holland radioed the control tower and asked for permission to execute a 360° left turn, which was immediately granted by the tower controller.

The B-52 then began the 360° left turn around the tower starting from about the midfield point of the runway. Located just behind the tower was an area of restricted airspace, reportedly because of a nuclear weapons storage facility. Apparently to avoid flying through the restricted airspace, Holland flew the aircraft in an extremely tight, steeply banked turn while maintaining the low, 250-foot (75 m) AGL altitude. Approximately three-quarters of the way around the turn, at 14:16, the aircraft banked past 90°, descended rapidly, clipped power lines and hit the ground and exploded, killing the four crew members. McGeehan was seated in an ejection seat, but according to the medical statement, he had only "partially ejected at the time of impact"; it does not state whether or not he cleared the aircraft. Huston was also seated in an ejection seat and the medical statement indicated that he had not initiated the ejection sequence. Wolff's seat was not ejection-capable. One airman on the ground was injured.

== Investigation ==
The USAF immediately convened a safety investigation board under the direction of the USAF's Chief of Safety, Brigadier General Orin L. Godsey. The board released the report of its investigation into the crash on August 10, 1994. A final evaluation of the safety investigation was released on January 31, 1995. An accident investigation board, called an "AFR 110-14 Investigation," released a separate report in 1995. Unlike the USAF safety investigation, which was released only to U.S. Department of Defense personnel, the AFR 110-14 report was released to the general public.

The AFR 110-14 investigation identified several factors which contributed to the crash, including the actual crash sequence, the personality and earlier behavior of Bud Holland, previous supervision and lack of corrective action exercised by USAF officers over Holland, mission planning and execution, and other environmental and human factors.

=== Crash sequence ===
Turning flight stall illustrated: the tighter the turn, the greater the lift (and thus angle of attack, AoA) required to counter the sum of centrifugal force and weight. If the critical AoA is exceeded, the aircraft will stall, regardless of the airspeed remaining constant.

The investigation found that as the B-52 entered its final turn sequence around the tower, its indicated airspeed (IAS) was 182 knots (209 mph; 337 km/h). Although Holland increased the engine power after starting the turn, his input came too late to maintain the aircraft's airspeed, as the B-52 turbofan engines take up to eight seconds to respond to throttle commands. Even though the airspeed indicator was available to all four aircrew members, the aircraft's airspeed was allowed to continue to decrease. Eight seconds before impact, the aircraft's IAS had deteriorated to 145 knots (167 mph; 269 km/h) and the aircraft's bank angle increased past 60°. At this time Holland or McGeehan applied full right spoiler, right rudder, and nose-up elevator, and the aircraft entered a turning flight stall (also called accelerated stall). This phenomenon is an aerodynamic stall—a sudden loss of lift—that occurs at a higher airspeed than the design stall speed (which always refers to straight and level flight), because the aircraft is turning, creating greater load on the wings due to centrifugal force. More speed is required to maintain adequate lift in a turn. Due to the bank of 60° or more, the stall speed for the aircraft at that moment was 147 knots (169 mph; 272 km/h). Thus, flying 2 knots slower, the aircraft stalled, without having sufficient altitude to recover before striking the ground.

=== Holland's previous behavior and USAF leaders' reactions ===
The accident board stated that Holland's macho, daredevil personality significantly influenced the crash sequence. USAF personnel testified that Holland had developed a reputation as an aggressive pilot who often broke flight-safety and other rules. The rule-breaking included flying below minimum-clearance altitudes and exceeding bank-angle limitations and climb rates. Holland also regularly and illegally parked his car in a Red Curbed zone (designated fire lanes, fire hydrant zones, or critical emergency egress routes, blocking emergency response vehicles from access), adjacent to the wing headquarters building.

An earlier incident occurred in 1991 when a B-52 piloted by Holland performed a circle above a softball game in which Holland's daughter was participating. Beginning at 2,500 feet (760 m) AGL, Holland's aircraft executed the circle at 65° of bank. In a maneuver described by one witness as a "death spiral", the nose of the aircraft continued to drop and the bank angle increased to 80°. After losing 1,000 feet (300 m) of altitude, Holland regained control of the aircraft.

During a May 19, 1991, air show at Fairchild, Holland was the command pilot of the B-52 aerial-demonstration flight. During the demonstration, Holland's aircraft violated several safety regulations, including exceeding bank and pitch limits, flying directly over the air-show spectators, and possibly violating altitude restrictions. The wing staff observed the demonstration, but apparently took no action.

On July 12, 1991, Holland commanded a B-52 for a flyover during a change-of-command ceremony for the 325th Bomb Squadron at Fairchild. During both the practice and the actual flyover, Holland's aircraft flew at altitudes below 100 feet (30 m) – well below the established minimum altitude – flew steeply banked turns in excess of 45°, exceeded pitch-angle limits, and executed a wingover. The wingover was not specifically prohibited but was not recommended, because it could damage the aircraft. After witnessing the flyover, the wing commander Colonel Arne Weinman and his deputy commander for operations (DO), Colonel Arnold Julich, verbally reprimanded Holland, but took no formal action.

During the May 17, 1992, Fairchild air show, Holland was again the command pilot of the B-52 aerial demonstration flight. During the demonstration, Holland's aircraft again violated several safety regulations, including several low-altitude, steep turns in excess of 45° of bank and a high pitch angle climb, estimated at over 60° nose high which Holland finished with a wingover maneuver. The new wing commander apparently took no action. One week later Colonel Capotosti became the new DO. At some point after assuming the position, Capotosti, on his own initiative, warned Holland that if he violated any more safety regulations, Capotosti would ground him (remove him from flying status). Capotosti did not document his warning to Holland or take any other kind of formal action.

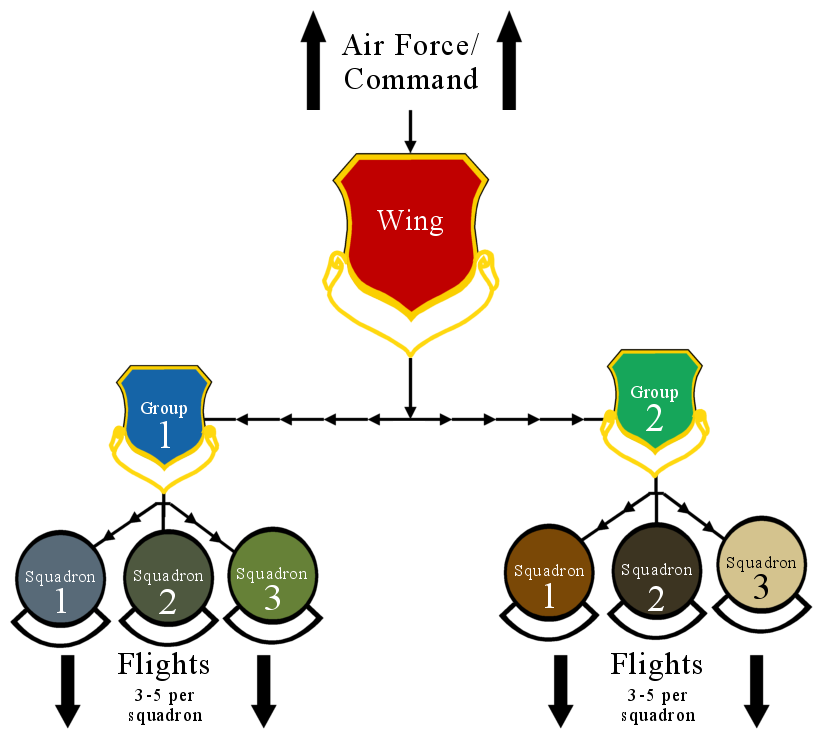
Basic structure of USAF wings, groups, and squadrons

On April 14 and 15, 1993, Holland was the mission commander of a two-ship training mission to a bombing range near Guam in the Pacific Ocean. During the mission, Holland flew his aircraft closer to the other B-52 than regulations allowed. Holland also asked his navigator to videotape the bombs falling from the aircraft from inside the bomb bay, which was against regulations. Holland's navigator later brought the video to the attention of three Fairchild USAF officers. The first, Lieutenant Colonel Bullock, the current 325th Bomb Squadron commander, did not do anything about it and may have tried to use the videotape as leverage to coerce the navigator into accepting a position as mission scheduler for the wing. The second, the deputy operations group commander, Lieutenant Colonel Harper, told the crew member to conceal the evidence. The third, the DO, allegedly responded to reports of the video by stating, "Okay, I don't want to know anything about that video—I don't care".

At the August 8, 1993, Fairchild air show, Holland once again commanded the B-52 demonstration flight. The demonstration profile once again included bank angles greater than 45°, low-altitude passes, and another high pitch climbing maneuver, this time in excess of 80° nose high. The climb was so steep that fuel flowed out of the vent holes from the aircraft's wing tanks. The new wing commander, Brigadier General James M. Richards, and the new DO, Colonel William E. Pellerin, both witnessed the demonstration, but neither took any action.

On March 10, 1994, Holland commanded a single-aircraft training mission to the Yakima Bombing Range, to provide an authorized photographer an opportunity to document the aircraft as it dropped training munitions. The minimum aircraft altitude permitted for that area was 500 feet (150 m) AGL. During the mission, Holland's aircraft was filmed crossing one ridgeline about 30 feet (10 m) above the ground. Fearing for their safety, the photography crew ceased filming and took cover as Holland's aircraft again passed low over the ground, this time estimated as clearing the ridgeline by only 3 feet (0.91 m). The co-pilot on Holland's aircraft testified that he grabbed the controls to prevent Holland from flying the aircraft into the ridge while the aircraft's other two aircrew members repeatedly screamed at Holland: "Climb! Climb!" Holland responded by laughing and calling one of the crew members "a pussy".

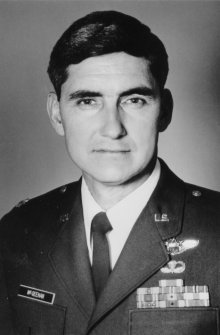
Lt Col Mark McGeehan, the copilot on the accident flight

After that mission, the crew decided that they would never again fly with Holland and reported the incident to the bomb squadron leadership. The squadron commander, Lieutenant Colonel Mark McGeehan, reported the incident to Pellerin and recommended that Holland be removed from flying duty. Pellerin consulted with Holland and gave him an oral reprimand and warning not to repeat the behavior, but refused to take him off flying duty. Pellerin also did not document the incident or the reprimand or notify his superiors, who remained unaware of the incident. McGeehan then decided that in order to protect his aircrews, he (McGeehan) would be the co-pilot on any future missions in which Holland was the command pilot. Evidence suggests that, after this incident, there was considerable animosity between Holland and McGeehan.

In preparation for the 1994 Fairchild air show, Holland was again selected as the command pilot for the B-52 demonstration flight. On June 15, 1994, Holland briefed the new wing commander, Colonel William Brooks, on the proposed flight plan. The demonstration profile, as briefed by Holland, included numerous violations of regulations, including steep bank angles, low-altitude passes, and steep pitch attitudes. Brooks ordered Holland not to exceed 45° bank angles or 25° pitch attitude during the demonstration. During the first practice session, on June 17, Holland repeatedly violated these orders. Brooks witnessed this, but took no action. Pellerin flew with Holland on that flight and reported to Brooks that, "the profile looks good to him; looks very safe, well within parameters." The next practice flight on June 24 ended with the crash.

=== Other factors ===
The demonstration profile as designed by Holland included a 360° turn around Fairchild's air-traffic-control tower. Holland had not attempted this maneuver in previous air-show demonstrations. During the final flight, Holland performed a series of 60° banked turns and a 68° pitch climb in violation of Brooks' orders. No evidence exists that McGeehan or Wolff attempted to intervene as Holland executed the maneuvers.

Pellerin was originally scheduled to fly in this mission, as he had done on the June 17 flight. Pellerin was unavailable for the flight on June 24 and Wolff was selected as the replacement aircrew member. Due to the short notice of his assignment to the mission, Wolff did not participate in the pre-flight briefing and boarded the aircraft after the engines were started. Thus, Wolff was not aware of the planned mission profile and did not have an opportunity to raise any objections before take-off.

All of the aircrew involved in the crash had only limited flying time in the months before the crash. The B-52's aircrew were apparently unaware that the aircraft had stalled until shortly before impact, indicated by a failure to apply standard recovery techniques to the aircraft once it entered the stall. The investigation reported that, even if the proper stall recovery techniques had been applied, the aircraft was likely too low to recover before hitting the ground.

Four days before the accident, on June 20, Dean Mellberg, an emotionally disturbed ex-USAF serviceman, entered Fairchild's hospital and shot and killed four people and wounded 22 others before being killed by a security policeman. The crime was a major distraction for personnel stationed at Fairchild for some time afterwards.

=== Conclusions ===
The accident investigation concluded that the crash was primarily attributable to Holland's personality and behavior, USAF leaders' inadequate reactions to the previous incidents involving Holland, and the sequence of events and aircrew response during the final flight of the aircraft. Holland's disregard for procedures governing the safe operation of the B-52 aircraft that he commanded and the absence of firm and consistent corrective action by his superior officers allowed Holland to believe that he could conduct his flight in an unsafe manner, culminating with the slow, steeply banked, 360° turn around the control tower.

The other environmental factors involved, including the addition of a new maneuver (the 360° turn around the tower), inadequate pre-flight involvement of Colonel Wolff, and the distractions from the shooting four days prior, combined with Holland's unsafe and risk-taking piloting behavior to produce conditions favorable for the crash to occur. The final factor, according to the USAF investigation report, was the 10-knot (19 km/h) wind and its effect on the maneuvers required to achieve the intended flightpath in relation to the ground.

== Aftermath ==
On May 19, 1995, Pellerin pleaded guilty at a USAF court-martial proceeding to two counts of dereliction of duty for his actions, or lack thereof, that contributed to the crash. He was sentenced to forfeit $1,500 of salary a month for five months and received a written reprimand. The USAF did not reveal whether any other officer involved in the chain of events leading to the crash received any type of administrative or disciplinary action. Critics of the USAF's safety record stated that this crash was an example of a pattern of problems related to enforcement of safety procedures within the USAF.

Although the accident investigation found that procedures and policies were supposedly already in place to prevent such a crash from occurring again, the fact that this crash occurred showed that in at least one instance, the existing safety policies and their enforcement had been grievously inadequate. To re-emphasize the importance of adherence to existing safety policies and correcting the actions of anyone violating them at any time, the USAF quickly distributed the findings of the accident investigation throughout the service. These measures failed to prevent another accident with almost identical circumstances sixteen years later, when a C-17 transport aircraft crashed shortly after taking off from Elmendorf Air Force Base, Alaska, on an aerial-display practice flight.

Today, the Fairchild crash is used in both military and civilian aviation environments as a training aid in teaching crew resource management and to show the importance of enforcing safety regulations.

Footage of the Fairchild crash was used in the making of the 2015 film Project Almanac, depicting an airline accident, which sparked public anger among relatives of Wolff and McGeehan. After an initial claim by Paramount Pictures that the video in question was of a 2009 Tokyo crash, producer Michael Bay issued an apology to the families, and the footage was removed from the film's theatrical release and associated trailers at Bay's request.

== See also ==
- Lists of air show accidents and incidents
- List of air show accidents and incidents in the 20th century
- List of air show accidents and incidents in the 21st century
