= Stress in the aviation industry =

Pilot's wellbeing whilst working

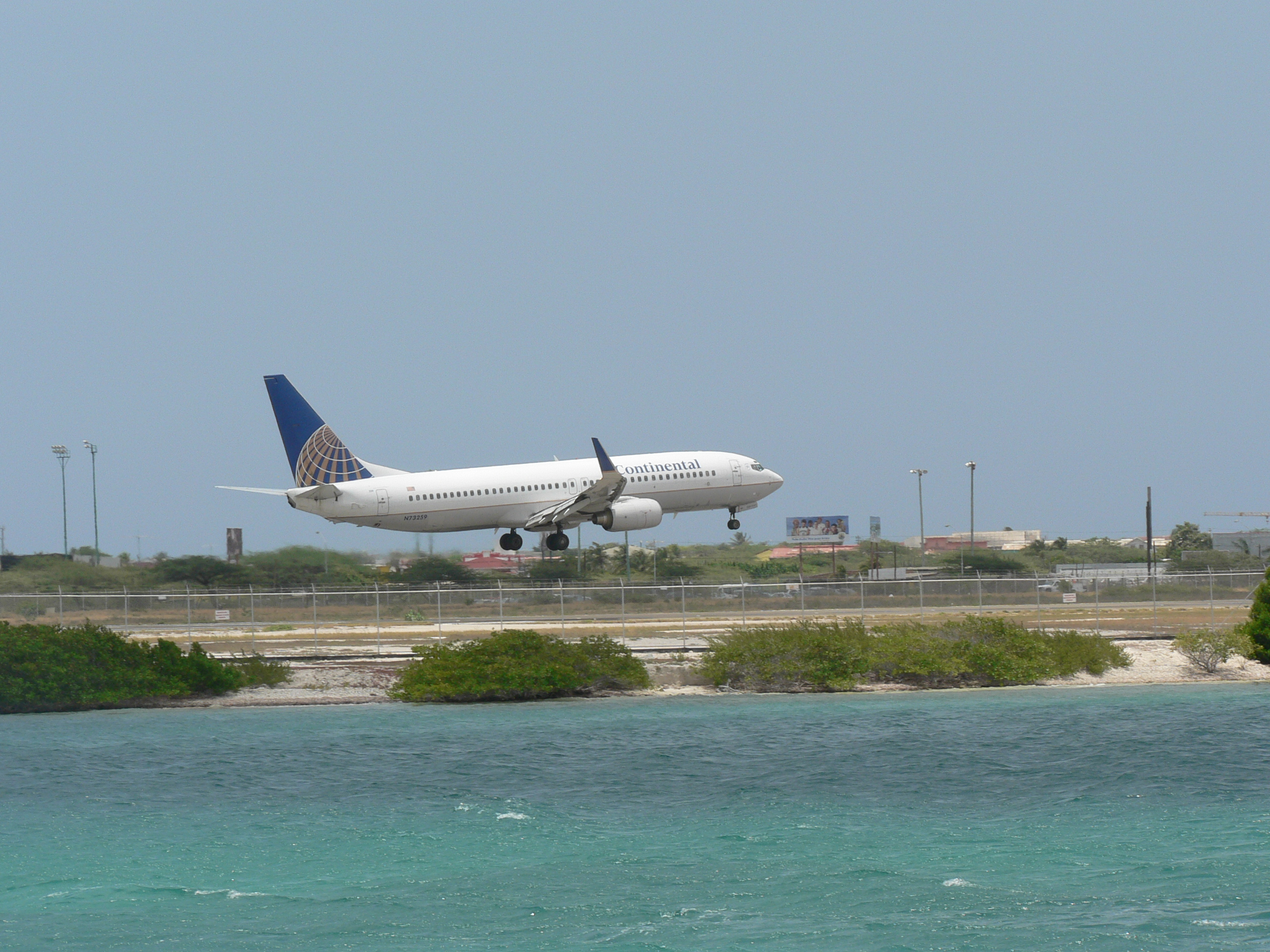
Pilot workloads and stress increase during landing

In aviation, pilot stress is common, with three primary sources: physiological stressors, psychological stressors, and environmental stressors. Professional pilots can experience stress in flight, on the ground during work-related activities, and during personal time because of the influence of their occupation. The job of airline pilot can be extremely stressful due to its often high workload and its responsibilities, including assuring the safety of the thousands of passengers they transport around the world. Chronic levels of stress can negatively impact one's health, job performance and cognitive functioning.

Stress is not a purely negative influence; it can motivate people to improve and help them adapt to a new environment. But accidents become more likely when a pilot is under excessive stress, as it dramatically affects his or her physical, emotional, and mental conditions. Stress "jeopardizes decision-making relevance and cognitive functioning" and it is a prominent cause of pilot error. Being a pilot is considered a unique job that requires managing high workloads and good psychological and physical health. More than many other professionals in roles typically associated with stress, pilots are considered to be highly affected by stress levels. One study reports that 70% of surgeons agreed that stress and fatigue do not impact their performance level, while only 26% of pilots denied that stress influences their performance. Pilots themselves acknowledge how powerful stress can be, yet many accidents and incidents continue to occur and have occurred, such as Asiana Airlines Flight 214, American Airlines Flight 1420, and Polish Air Force Tu-154.

== Aviation accidents caused by stress ==
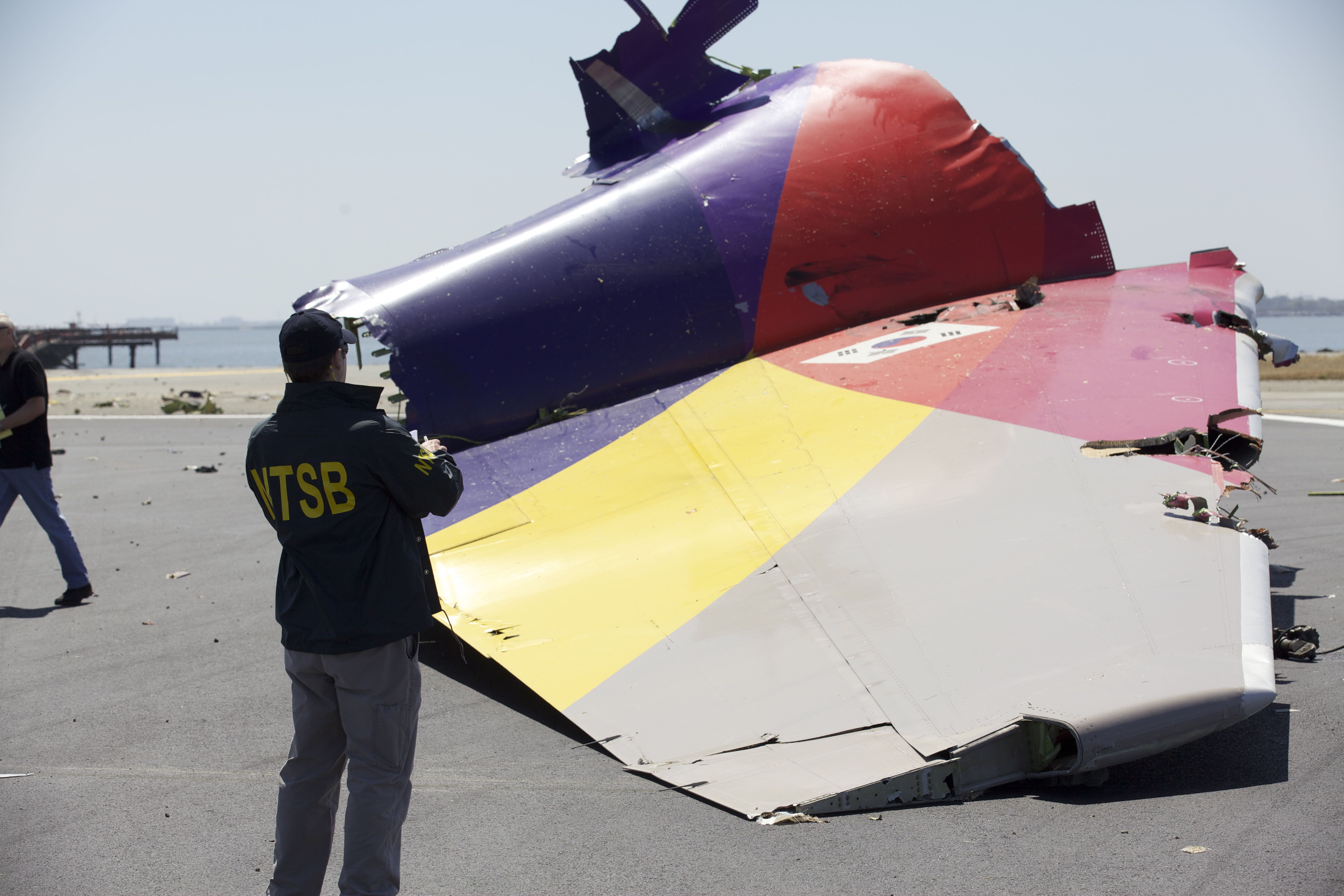
Asiana Airlines Flight 214 tail wreckage due to the crash

The July 6, 2013, crash of Asiana Airlines Flight 214 was one of many accidents triggered by stress. During the aircraft's final approach to San Francisco International Airport from Incheon International Airport, the plane hit the edge of the runway and its tail came apart, followed by the fuselage bursting into flames. The trainee pilot flying was "stressed about the approach to the unfamiliar airport and thought the autothrottle was working before the jet came in too low and too slow." He believed that the autothrottle, which is designed to maintain speed, was always on. The trainee pilot should have had full understanding of his flight systems and high mode awareness, but did not. He told the National Transportation Safety Board that he should have studied more. His insufficient knowledge of the flight deck automation and an unfamiliar airport structure caused excessive stress, and the aftermath was disastrous: three passengers died and more than 187 passengers were injured.

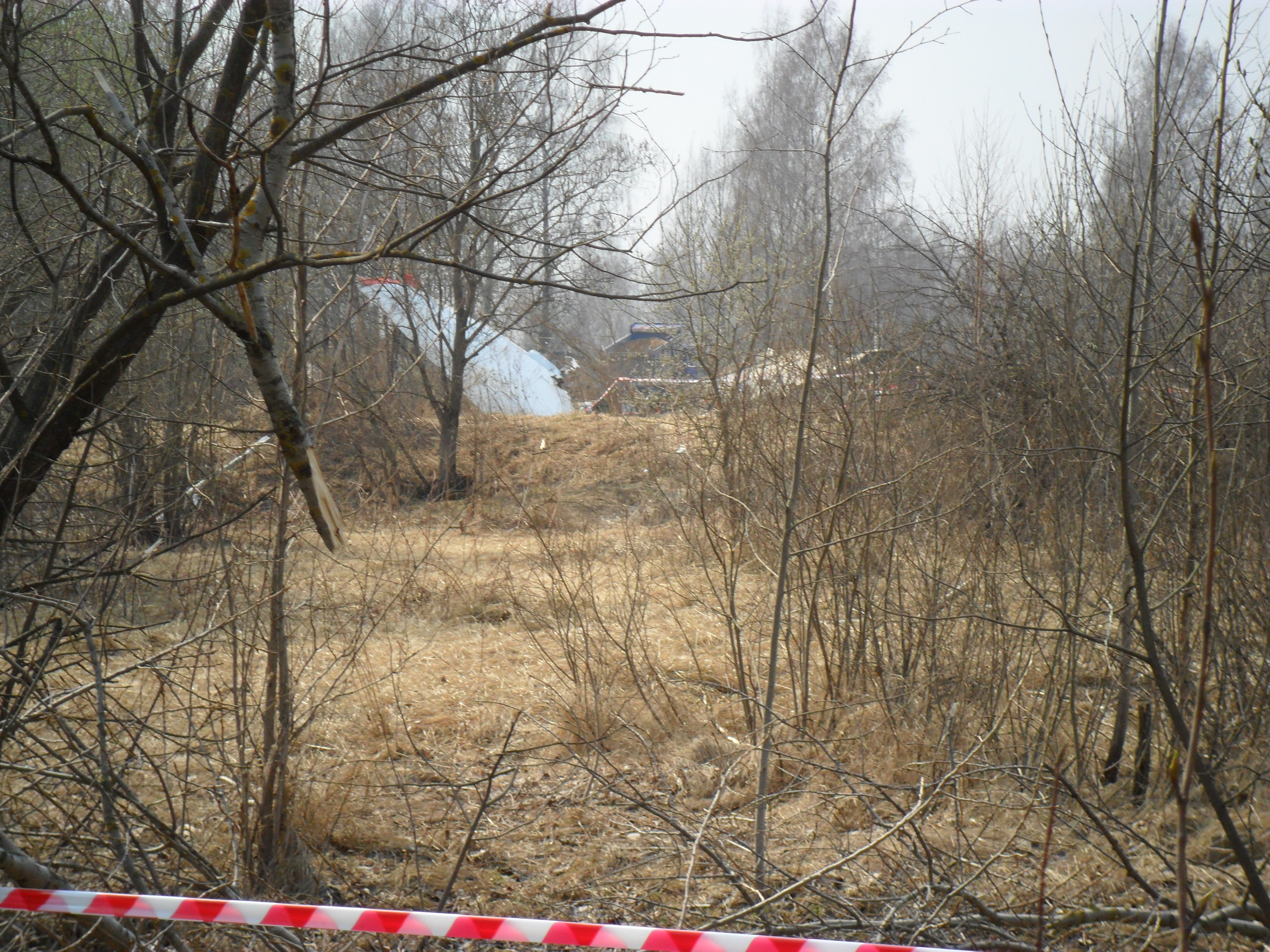
Polish Air Force Tu-154 crash site

On June 1, 1999, American Airlines Flight 1420, was set to land in Little Rock, Arkansas. Captain Richard Buschmann was considered an expert pilot, with over ten thousand hours of flight time. The First Officer was Michael Origel with under five thousand hours of flight time. With a major thunderstorm was in the area, Captain Buschmann decided to change runways due to the high crosswind and rapidly changing wind direction. The pilots were overwhelmed with tasks and the stress of the difficult landing, forgetting to arm the automatic ground spoiler and ground braking systems. It was too difficult to control the aircraft after touchdown and it slid off the runway and collided with a large steel walkway, resulting in the death of Captain Buschmann and 10 passengers, and many additional severe injuries.

Another example is the Polish Air Force Tu-154 crash in April 2010, which killed Polish president Lech Kaczynski. During landing, the pilot, Captain Arkadiusz Protasiuk, had difficulty landing due to severely foggy conditions, but the number of high-status passengers and priority of arriving on time pressured him to continue. Captain Protasiuk brought the aircraft down through the clouds at a too low altitude, resulting in a controlled flight into terrain. The plane crashed into a forest, killing the crew and all the passengers. Analysis by the Interstate Aviation Committee of the cockpit voice recording revealed that there was never a direct command for the pilot to go through with the landing, but the report did show that the pilot was under a "cascade of stress—much of it emanating from his powerful passengers—as Captain Protasiuk slipped below the 'decision altitude'." The accident led to the death of 96 people, due to the high amount of stress being put on the pilot, affecting his mental state and inhibiting him from doing his job.

=== Advances in cockpit technology ===
In the Asiana Airlines Flight 214 study, Kathy Abbott of the Federal Aviation Administration stated that "the data suggests that the highly integrated nature of current flight decks and additional add-on features have increased flight crew knowledge and introduced complexity that sometimes results in pilot confusion and errors during flight deck operation." U.S. investigators instructed Boeing to fix the 777's complex control systems because pilots "no longer fully understand" how aircraft systems work. As technology advances, more and more new instruments are put into the cockpit panel. As these increase, cognitive demands also increase, and pilots are becoming distracted from their primary tasks. Although having various types of information enhances situation awareness, it also overloads sensory channels. Since human's cognitive loads are limited, information overloads increase the risk of flight accidents. Pilots have more difficulty perceiving and processing data when the amount of information is overwhelming.

== Effects on memory ==
Model of working memory

There are three components of memory: long-term, short-term, and working memory. When stress kicks in, a pilot's working memory is impaired. Stress either limits the amount of resources that can be accessed through working memory or the time which these sources can be accessed are inhibited. When a pilot feels stressed, he or she will notice an increase in heart rate, higher blood pressure, muscle tensions, anxiety and fatigue. These physiological stress symptoms eventually interrupt the pilot's cognitive functions by reducing his or her memory capacity and restraining cue samples. Through a study researchers found that stress greatly affects flight performances including, smoothness and accuracy of landing, ability to multi-task, and being ahead of the plane. Further research shows that under high stress, people are likely to make the same decision he or she has previously made, whether or not it led to a positive or a negative consequence before.

== Causes of stress ==
Stress can be caused by environmental, physiological, or psychological factors. Environmental stress can be caused by loud noise, small cockpit space, temperature, or any factors affecting one physically via one's current surroundings. Unpleasant environments can raise one's stress level. Physiological stress is a physical change due to influence of fatigue, anxiety, hunger, or any factors that may change a pilot's biological rhythms. Lastly, psychological factors include personal issues, including experiences, mental health, relationships and any other emotional issues a pilot may face. All these stressors interfere with cognitive activity and limit a pilot's ability to achieve peak performance. It is important to minimize these possible sources of stress to maximize pilots' cognitive loads, which affects their perception, memory, and logical reasoning.

== Stress in flight ==
Yerkes–Dodson law shows that too low or too high arousal results in low performance

Researchers found that improvements in technology have significantly reduced aviation accidents, but human error still endangers flight safety. An individual reacts to stress in different ways, depending on how one perceives stress. If an individual judges that he or she has resources to cope with demands of the situation, it will be evaluated as a challenge. On the other hand, if an individual believes situational demands outweigh the resources, he or she will evaluate it as a threat, leading to poorer performance. Under the threat response, researchers stated that pilots became more distracted with their controls and had higher tendencies to scan unnecessary instruments.

One type of decision-making error a pilot may make is a plan continuation error (PCE). PCE is defined as an "erroneous behavior due to failure to revise a flight plan despite emerging evidence that suggests it is no longer safe." The French Land Transport Accident Investigation Bureau (BEA) stated that 41.5% of casualties in general aviation were caused by "get-home-itis syndrome", when a pilot decides to continue to their planned destination no matter what it takes. A pilot must use their own judgment to go-around whenever it is necessary, but he or she often fails to do so. Through the study, it was found that mental workload of stress and heart rate increases when making go-around decisions. A pilot feels pressured and stressed by the obligation to get passengers to their destinations at the right time and to continue the flight as planned. When choosing between productivity and safety, pilots' risk assessments can be influenced unconsciously. The American Airlines Flight 1420 accident is one example caused by PCE; although the flight crew knew that approaching severe thunderstorms made their original flight plan dangerous, they continued on.

=== Positive and negative views of stress ===
Stress can narrow the focus of attention in a good way and in a bad way. Stress helps to simplify a pilot's task and enables him or her to focus on major issues by eliminating nonessential information. In other words, a pilot can simplify information and react accordingly to major cues only. However, when a pilot exceeds his or her cognitive load, it will eventually narrow his or her attention too much and cause inattentional deafness: The pilot will mainly focus on doing the primary task and ignore secondary tasks, such as audible alarms and spoken instructions.

== Military pilot stress ==
Military pilots experience a more fast-paced and stressful career compared to airline and general aviation pilots. Military pilots experience significantly greater stress levels due to significant reliability and performance expectations. They hold a unique position in the workforce that includes peak physical and mental condition, high intelligence and extensive training. All military pilots, at times, must work under extreme conditions, experiencing high levels of stress, especially in a war zone. Soldiers are made to endure punishment and go through the most unthinkable situations. They are expected to continue with their job and at times completely ignore their own emotions. After initial training, the military completely reforms the individual, and in most cases incredible stress management skills are formed. The soldier is then sent off for further training, in this case to be a pilot, where they are tested and challenged even further to either fail or become one of the best.

Military pilots hold a lot of responsibility. Their jobs can include passenger or cargo transport, reconnaissance missions, or attacking from the air or flight training, all while expected to be in perfect mental and physical condition. These jobs place a responsibility on the pilot to avoid mistakes as millions of dollars, lives, or whole operations are at risk. At times stress does over take the pilot and emotions and human error can occur.

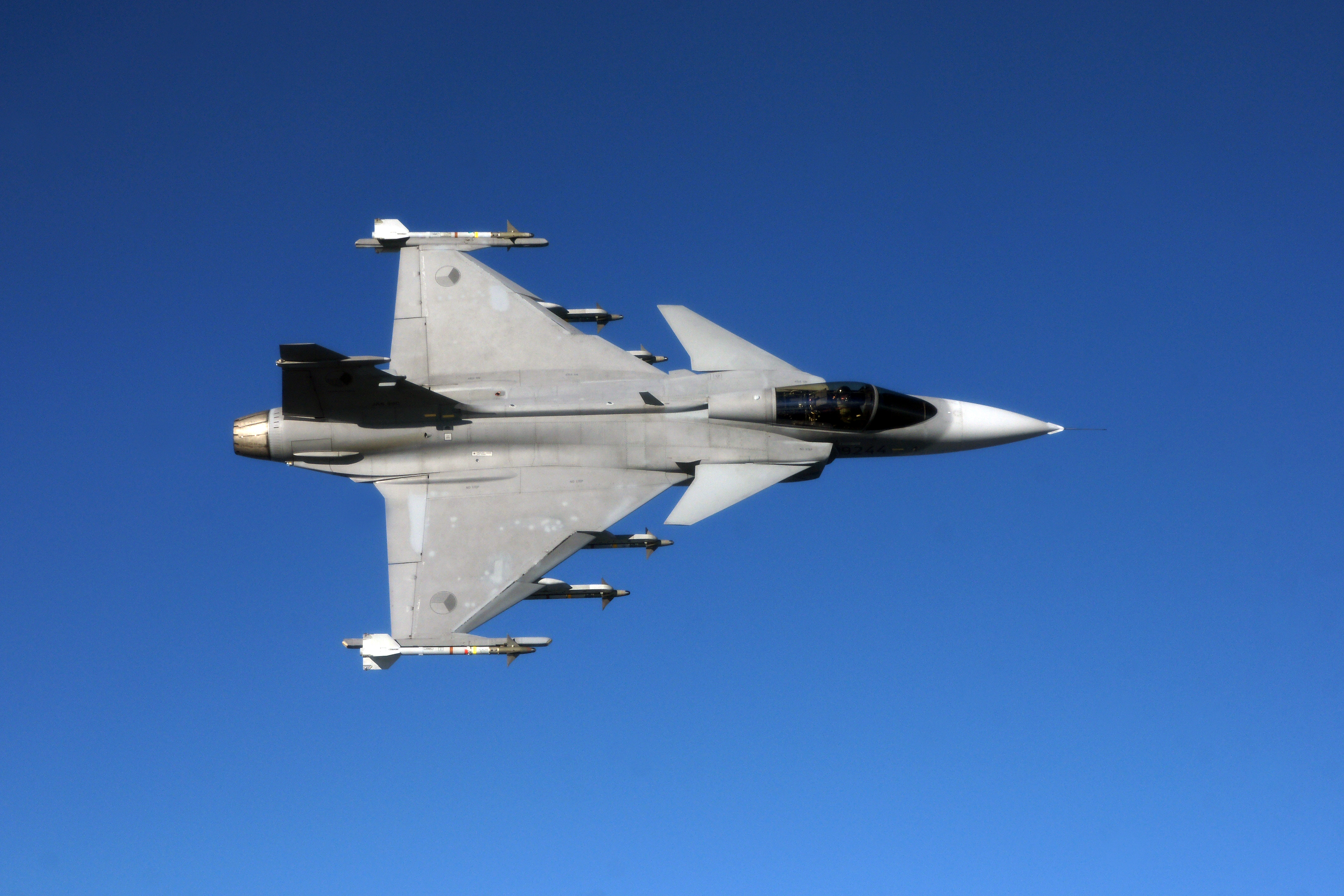
Military fighter jet JAS-39 Gripen

There are many occurrences of pilots bombing allied forces in friendly fire incidents out of error and having to live with the consequences.

The stress of the job itself or of any mistake made can hugely affect one's life outside work. Millions of veterans struggle with post-traumatic stress injuries, unhealthy coping strategies such as alcohol or substance abuse and in the worst of cases, suicide, which is very common. Many studies and help programs have been put in place, but there are many different cases and people that it is impossible to help everyone. Stress overcomes even the strongest, most highly trained pilots and can take the worst toll.

Everyone deals with stress in a different manner, but military pilots stand out on their own with unique stress-reducing and problem-solving skills. Their main strategy is to find the problem causing the stress and solve it immediately, so that they do not have to move to a secondary option, which consumes time they do not have. This is what they are taught in flight school; a sensor goes off and they immediately fix the problem. The main problem appears when pilots are going high speed or undergoing complicated maneuvers. Most times they are moving much faster than a human could even think, leaving a lot of room for human error. When an error occurs, however big or small, they can take on immense guilt for any problems that were caused, depending on their personality. This can affect their mental state and ability to continue their job. Stress can also take a physical toll on a pilot's body, for reasons such as grinding of their teeth in difficult situations, or bladder problems when the pilot is flying under a higher G-force or for a long distance.

=== Helicopter pilot stress ===
Helicopter pilots, particularly those flying helicopter emergency medical services (HEMS), face distinct occupational stressors related to time pressure, unpredictable missions, and safety-critical decision-making under adverse conditions. A study surveying 72 European HEMS pilots found that although their overall perception of work stressors was comparatively favorable, the stressor and resource factors most strongly associated with reduced well-being and energy levels were also those pilots rated most positively, indicating a complex relationship between job engagement and occupational strain.

== Improvements through crew resource management ==
Beginning in the 1950s, as planes became mechanically more reliable, human error became the main cause of aviation accidents. As stress and fatigue continue to be an issue in the aviation industry, various training programs have been developed to mitigate their effects. National Aeronautics and Space Administration has pointed out human limitations and emphasized the importance of teamwork. Crew resource management is a type of training conducted to teach a flight crew different behavioral strategies, such as situational awareness, stress management, and decision-making. When pilots are being hired, recruiters not only look at pilots' technical skills, but also at pilots' ability to learn from errors and evaluate how well they coordinate with other crew members.

== See also ==
- Air rage
- Environmental stress
- Pilot error
- Human factors in air safety
- Human reliability
- Airmanship
