= Environmental causes of aviation stress =

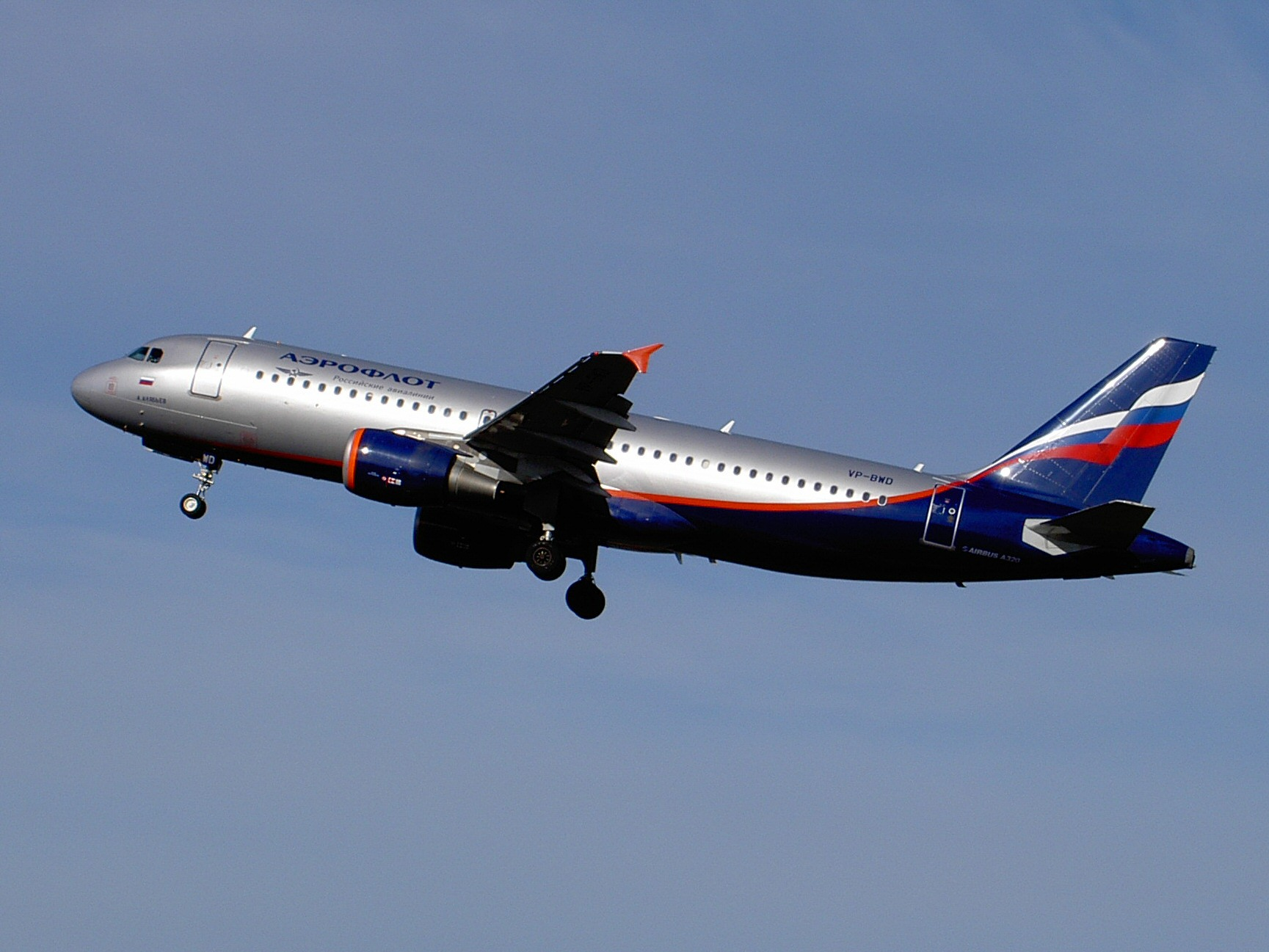
Five major sources of environmental stress affect pilots.

In aviation, a source of stress that comes from the environment is known as an environmental stressor. Stress is defined as a situation, variable, or circumstance that interrupts the normal functioning of an individual and, most of the time, causes a threat. It can be related not only to mental health, but also to physical health.

Operating in aviation environments brings a combination of stressors that vary in nature and intensity. In the aviation industry, the main environmental stressors are time pressure, workload and overload, fatigue, noise, and temperature. These stressors are interconnected, meaning that the presence of one may cause others to occur. Scientists have studied each stressor to determine how to minimize its effects.

== Environmental stressors ==
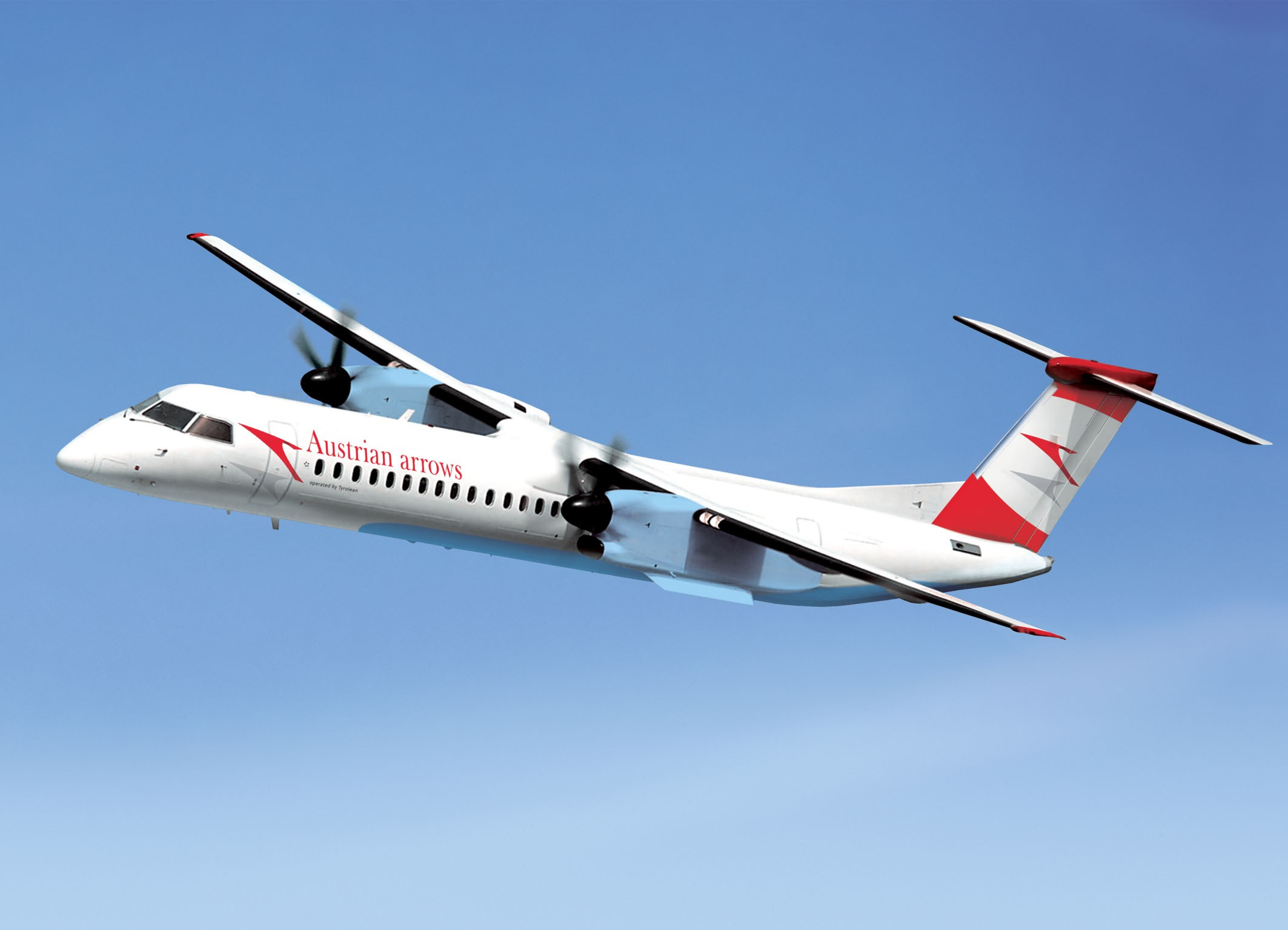
The Bombardier Dash-8 Q400 aircraft involved in the Colgan Air Flight 3407 accident on February 12, 2009

=== Time pressure ===
Time pressure occurs when there is a time limit on crew members' tasks or operations. For instance, China is experiencing more demand for air travel, so airlines in China are offering additional flights with the expectation of high-quality service. This puts pressure on crew members to work longer hours on tighter schedules, which causes time pressure and makes human error more likely. Christopher Wickens, a former head of the University of Illinois Urbana-Champaign's Aviation Human Factors Division, found a relationship between response time and error rates: The faster a pilot scans a plane's instrument panel, the less accurate his or her perception will be. James Reason, a researcher of human error, found that time pressure increased the possibility of human error eleven-fold.

According to a sample of data from the Aviation Safety Reporting System (ASRS), tight scheduling is the most common cause of time pressure, and traffic-jammed fixed-base operators (FBOs) are the second most common cause of aviation stress. The ASRS report showed that various sources of time pressure can cause a chain reaction, with one leading to another.

Sources of time pressure include:

Sources	Percent (%)
Tight scheduling	53
Slow FBO servicing	39
Passengers showing up late	38
Passenger handling issues	37
Delays	36
ATC congestion	32
Inoperative component	19
Weather-induced workload	18

Time pressure is impossible to avoid entirely, and the goal of researchers is to minimize the resulting human error. Pilots should be careful when facing such pressure, and take time to prioritize and re-evaluate their performances. Furthermore, use of checklists is highly recommended.

=== Workload and overload ===
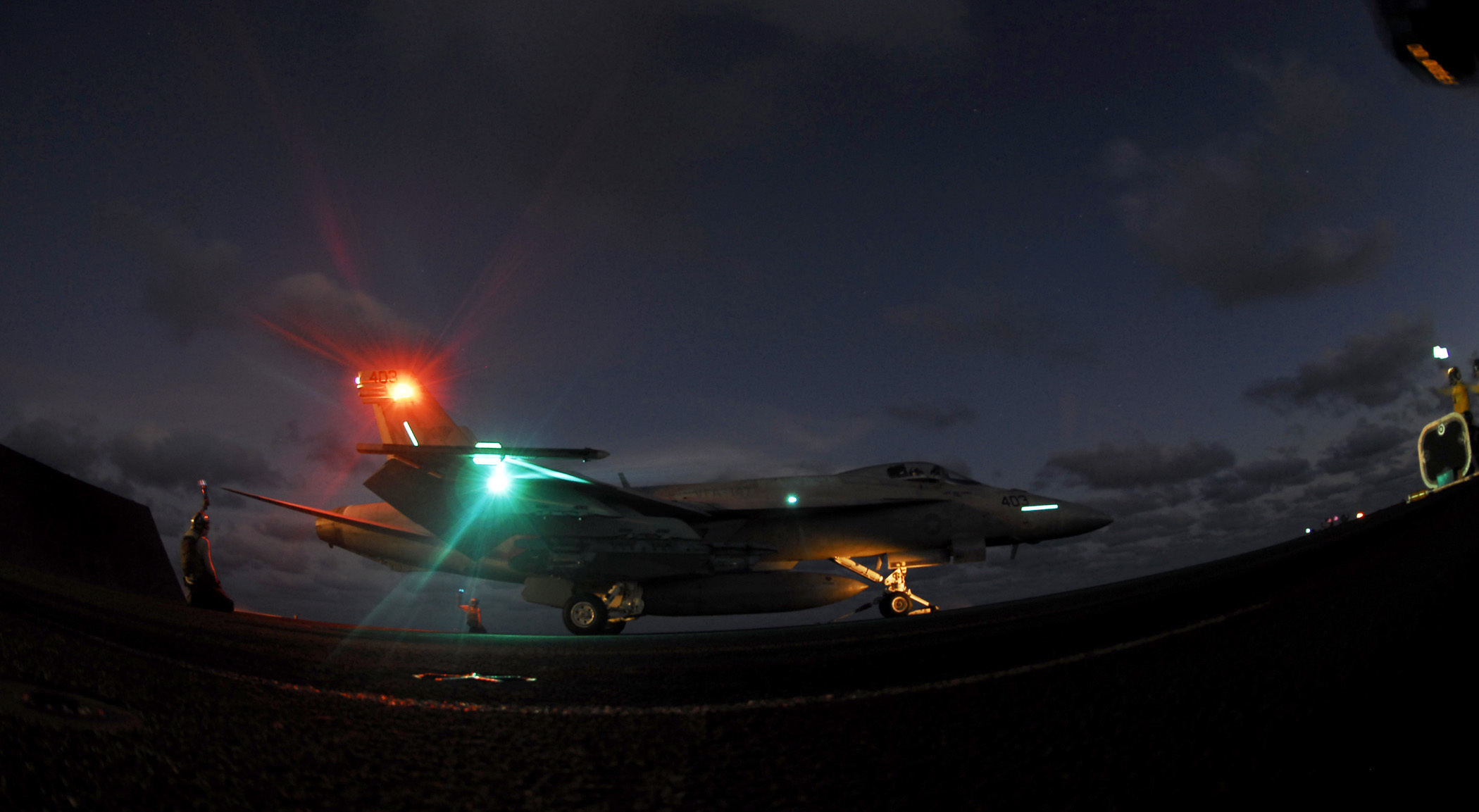
Workload significantly increases during night flying.

Workload and overload occurs when the amount of work exceeds a pilot's maximum working capacity. Studies show that this is the most serious environmental cause of aviation stress. There is a strong positive relationship between workload and stress level. According to Karasek's job strain model, workload stress is caused by shift work and job control. Normally, when pilots get a new job, they start by flying unfamiliar airplanes at unfavorable times, and both of these factors can cause stress. In addition, because fewer people work at night, each person is responsible for more tasks than a daytime employee would be. The second element of Karasek's model, job control, refers to employees' decision-making responsibility. The higher this responsibility, the higher the stress.

Another study by Wickens, of the University of Illinois, found that workload affects spatial awareness, an essential skill in maneuvering an aircraft through a three-dimensional space with hazards. During flight, pilots must monitor and control six variables. Three of them—yaw, pitch, and roll—relate to aircraft axes and are known as orientation variables. The other three—altitude, position, and lateral deviation—relate to flight path and are known as position variables. Wickens proposes that monitoring and controlling these variables creates a cumulative workload that can lead to poor spatial awareness.

Scientists first tried to minimize human error from workload by enhancing cockpit instrument displays. Cockpit designers studied two elements. The first, frame of instruments, refers to whether the airplane should appear to rotate while the background is stable (exocentric) or the background should rotate while the airplane is stable (egocentric). The designers concluded that, although skilled pilots perform equally well on either type of display, pilots overall perform better with the exocentric display. The second element, degree of integration, refers to whether cockpit displays should be two-dimensional or three-dimensional. The designers found that, even though 2D displays minimize the ambiguity of information because they require vertical and lateral mental work to convert them into 3D images, 3D displays present clearer information for pilots with less work.

=== Fatigue ===
The National Transportation Safety Board has suggested that pilots make more procedural and tactical decision errors if they have been awake for a longer-than-average period of time. It reported that, from 1974 to 1992, fatigue was involved in 7.8 percent of Air Force Class A accidents, 4 percent of Army accidents, and 4 to 7 percent of civil aviation accidents. Studies show an inverse relationship between fatigue and physical capability. As fatigue increases, the capability of the body decreases, as do operational tolerance and willingness. Decreasing motivation after a strenuous flight also hurts pilot performance.

Another study showed a similar relationship between fatigue, mental workload, and human performance. Subjective, performance, and psycho-physiological measures were taken for eight participants, ages 22 to 36, on three complexity tasks after sleep loss of one night. The data suggested that as continuous wakefulness increases, simple reaction time also increases, impairing operators' readiness for tasks.

Given the complex operations involved in aviation, avoiding fatigue is challenging. However, research suggests that planning strategies before and after flights can greatly improve pilot alertness and flight safety. The Aerospace Medical Association's Fatigue Countermeasures Subcommittee suggests hypnotics and other substances, some unregulated by the Food and Drug Administration, to maximize the quality of pilots' sleep before flights. The subcommittee's report revealed that the U.S. Air Force uses hypnotic drugs, such as temazepam, zolpidem, and zaleplon, for this purpose. However, since hypnotic drugs can cause sleep inertia upon waking, it is critical to consider the dosage given, the time of day, and the length of the sleep period. A non-medication approach involves healthy sleep practices, naps, exercise, and nutrition. The subcommittee suggested that the quality of sleep can be as important as the quantity, and that taking a nap before a night shift can increase pilot performance. In addition, proper exercise and nutrition help pilots maintain their physical health, which can reduce the negative effects of sleep loss.

=== Noise ===
According to research, exposure to noise can cause physical stress and long-term health risks such as hearing impairment, annoyance, and sleep disturbance, all of which can decrease performance.

Hearing impairment can be caused not only by noise during flights, but also by leisure activities like listening to music. According to the International Organization for Standardization (IOS), sound below 70 decibels will not cause hearing impairment for 95 percent of people. However, safe volume thresholds vary based on age and other factors.

Noise can also have the psycho-social effect of annoyance. This occurs between 55 and 60 decibels for about 40 percent of office workers.

A third effect of noise is sleep disturbance. Types of sleep disturbance include:

- changes in the cardiovascular system
- changes in sleep pattern, such as increased sleep latency time and premature awakening
- decreased depth of sleep
- increased motility during sleep
- changes in subjectively experienced sleep quality
- changes in the hormonal and immune systems

According to the IOS study, noise affects pilot performance by increasing arousal, decreasing attention to tasks, and altering strategic choices. Furthermore, unwanted noise can drown out other sounds, thus impairing communication between crew members, masking signals in the cockpit, and distracting crew members from significant social cues.

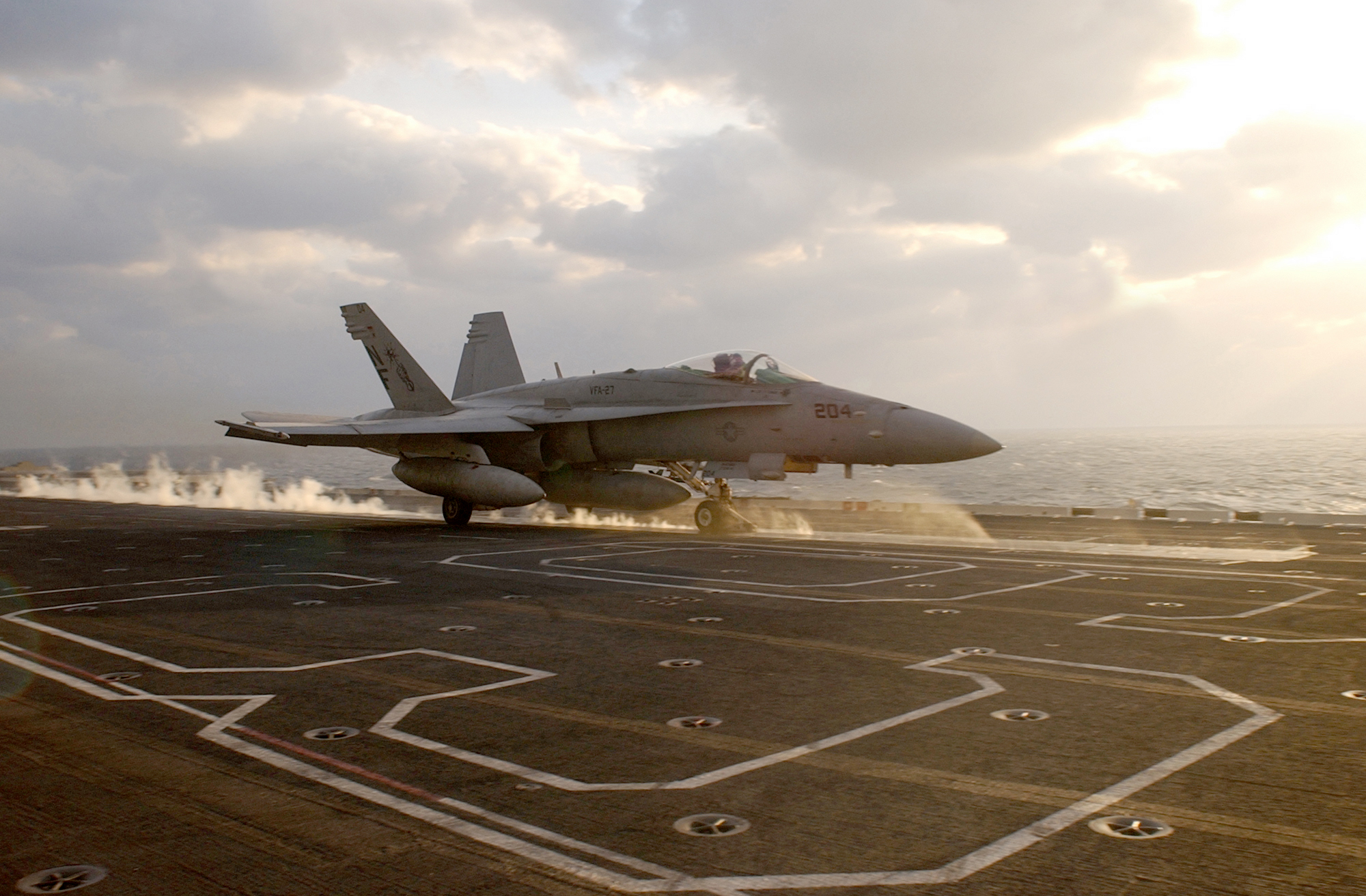
Thermal stress is normally experienced by military pilots.

=== Temperature ===
Stress caused by ambient temperature is called thermal stress and is normally experienced by military pilots. Although military aircraft have environmental control systems, the temperature inside the cockpit can quickly rise more than 10 degrees Celsius above the ambient temperature, and the Air Force has suggested that it is possible for cockpit temperatures to exceed 45 °C (113 °F). When such high temperatures occur in humid environments, both mental and physical performance will be degraded. When the aircraft operates close to the ground at high airspeed, the effect is worse because of the aerodynamic heating of the aircraft's surface.

Thermal stress is also caused by cold temperatures. When military pilots operate at high altitude with low airspeed, the temperature inside the cockpit falls. This affects both health and performance quality. In addition, thermal stress intensifies as the temperature difference between the departing airport and operating altitude increases. For instance, if a military pilot climbs from a 45 °C (113 °F) departing airport to a −60 °C (−76 °F) operating altitude of 40,000 feet, the rapid change creates thermal stress and hinders pilot performance.

One way to minimize thermal stress is to maintain temperature and pressure in the cockpit within acceptable ranges, using a cockpit temperature management system. However, one problem with this system is that it works by measuring the dry bulb temperature of surrounding air without taking radiant temperature and humidity into account. Radiant heat rises when operating at low altitudes because of the greenhouse effect and kinetic heating on the surface of the aircraft. Furthermore, if cockpit temperature exceeds skin temperature, which is 33 °C (91 °F), the pilot will sweat, leading to increased humidity as the sweat evaporates. Today, the Air Force uses a more advanced air-cooling system that assesses pilots' mean skin temperature and wet bulb globe temperature. By directly measuring pilots' condition in the cockpit, the new system minimizes thermal stress and supports performance quality.

== See also ==
- Stress in the aviation industry
- Environmental impact of aviation
- Pilot error
- Aviation accidents and incidents
