= Buah Nabar =

Village in Indonesia

Coordinates: 3.384°N 98.561°E

Buah Nabar is a village in Sibolangit, Deli Serdang Regency, North Sumatra, Indonesia.

== Air disaster ==
On September 26, 1997, Garuda Indonesia Flight 152 crashed near the village, killing all 234 people on board. It is the deadliest aviation disaster to occur in Indonesia.
