= Pilot error =

Decision, action, or inaction by an aircraft pilot

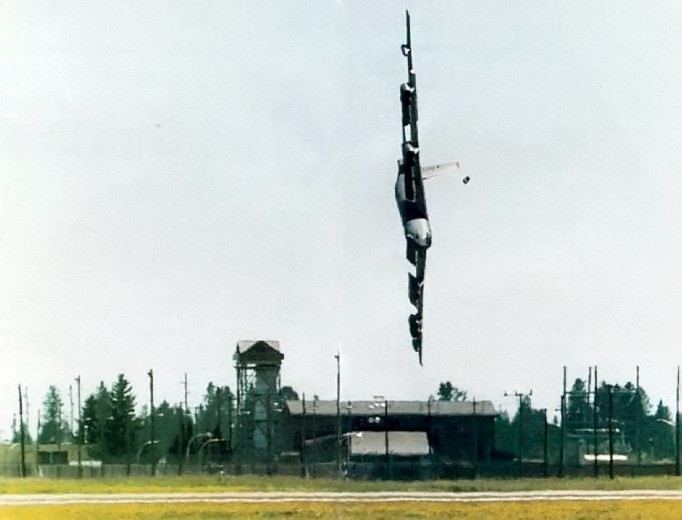
1994 Fairchild Air Force Base B-52 crash, caused by pilot Arthur Holland flying the aircraft beyond its operational limits. Here the aircraft is seen in an unrecoverable bank, a split second before the crash. This accident is now used in military and civilian aviation environments as a case study in teaching crew resource management.

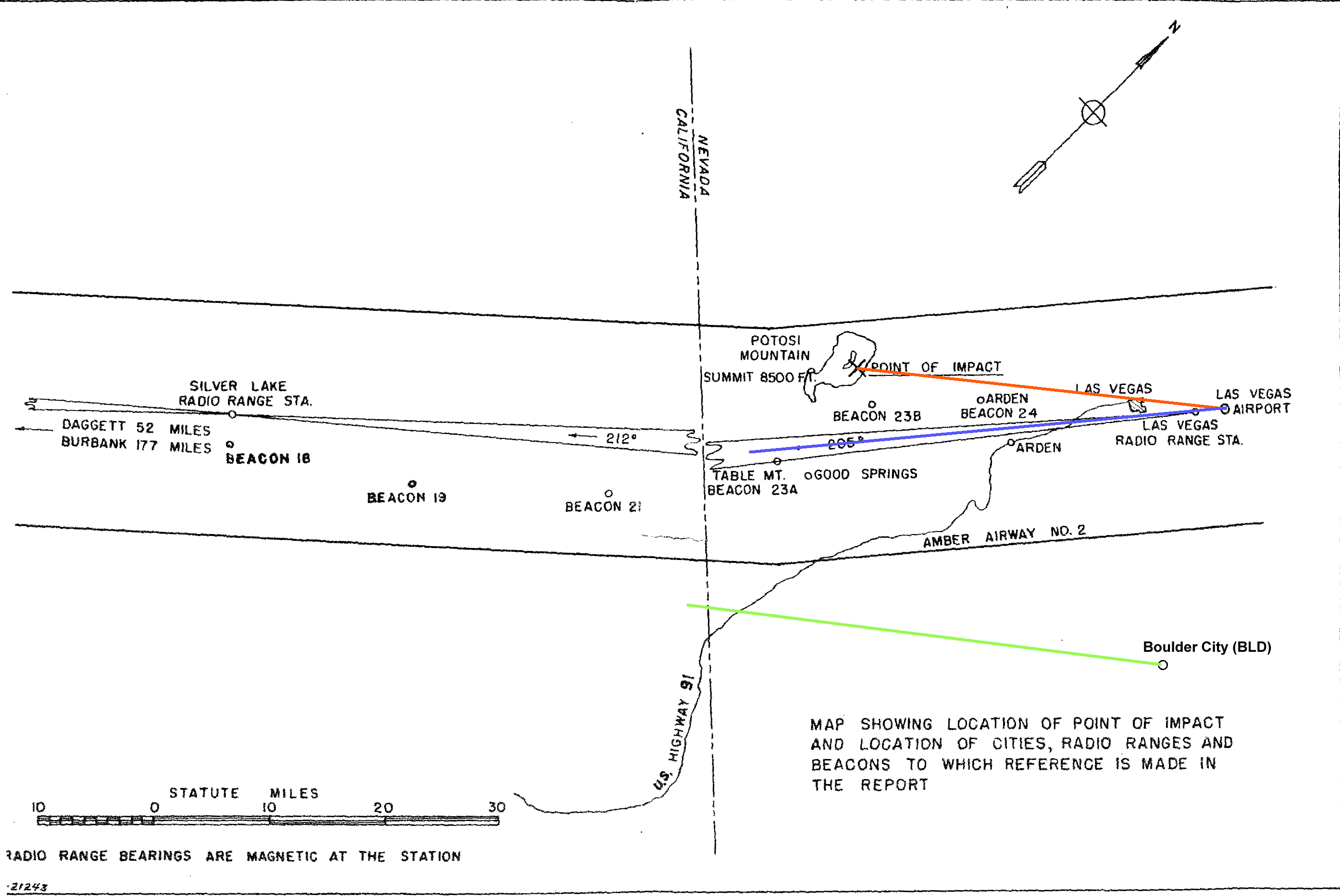
Actual flight path (red) of TWA Flight 3 from departure to crash point (controlled flight into terrain). Blue line shows the nominal Las Vegas course, while green is a typical course from Boulder. The pilot inadvertently used the Boulder outbound course instead of the appropriate Las Vegas course.

Departure/destination airports and crash site location of Varig Flight 254 (major navigational error leading to fuel exhaustion). The flight plan was later shown to 21 pilots of major airlines. No fewer than 15 pilots committed the same mistake.

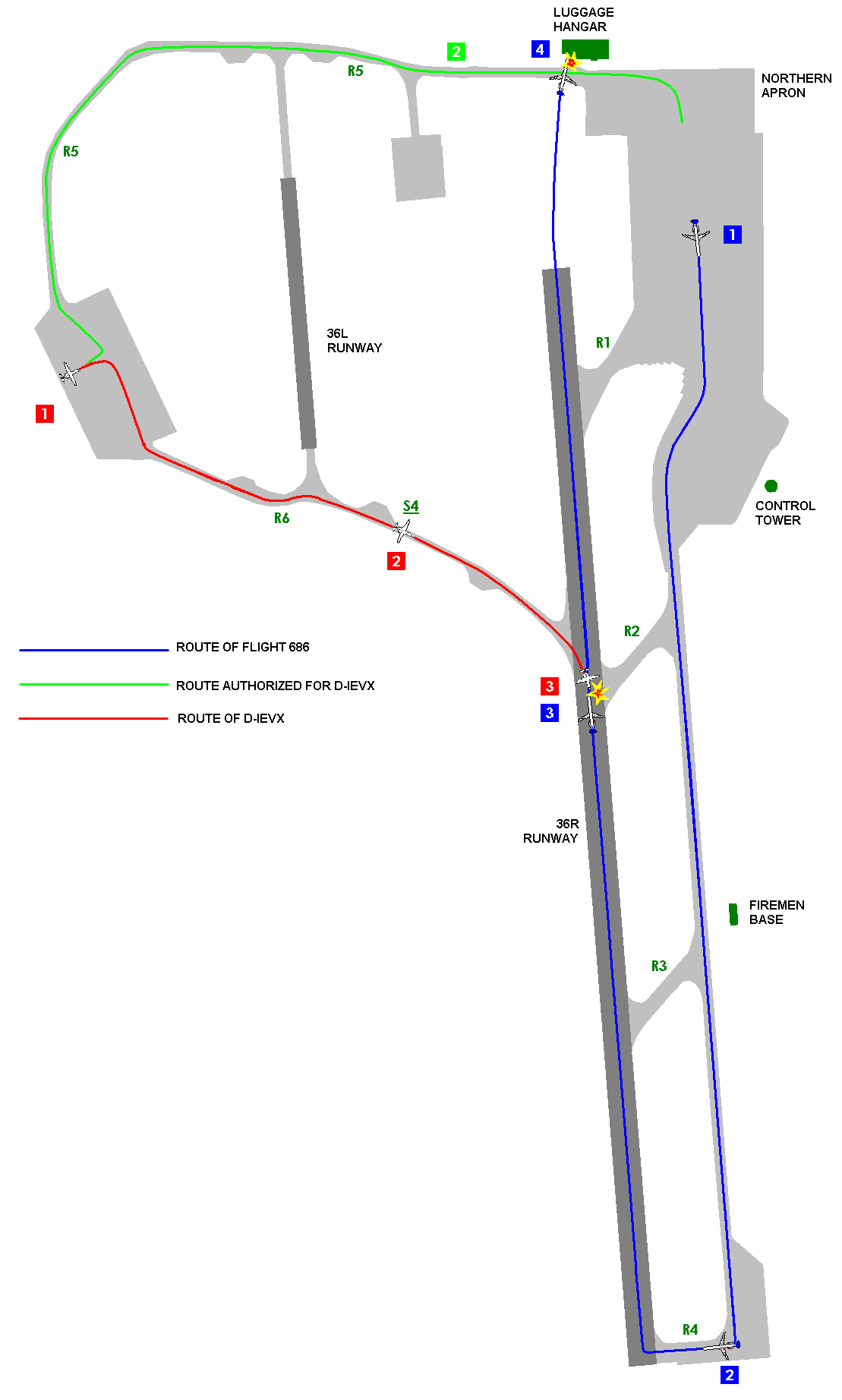
Map of the 2001 Linate Airport runway collision caused by taking the wrong taxiing route (red instead of green), as control tower had not given clear instructions. The accident occurred in thick fog.

The Tenerife airport disaster now serves as a textbook example. Due to several misunderstandings, the KLM flight tried to take off while the Pan Am flight was still on the runway. The airport was accommodating an unusually large number of commercial airliners, resulting in disruption of the normal use of taxiways.

The "three-pointer" design altimeter is one of the most prone to being misread by pilots (a cause of the UA 389 and G-AOVD crashes).

In aviation, pilot error generally refers to an action or decision made by a pilot that is a substantial contributing factor leading to an aviation accident. It also includes a pilot's failure to make a correct decision or take proper action. Errors are intentional actions that fail to achieve their intended outcomes. The Chicago Convention defines the term "accident" as "an occurrence associated with the operation of an aircraft [...] in which [...] a person is fatally or seriously injured [...] except when the injuries are [...] inflicted by other persons." Hence the definition of "pilot error" does not include deliberate crashing (and such crashes are not classified as accidents).

The causes of pilot error include psychological and physiological human limitations. Various forms of threat and error management have been implemented into pilot training programs to teach crew members how to deal with impending situations that arise throughout the course of a flight.

Accounting for the way human factors influence the actions of pilots is now considered standard practice by accident investigators when examining the chain of events that led to an accident.

== Description ==
Modern accident investigators avoid the words "pilot error", as the scope of their work is to determine the cause of an accident, rather than to apportion blame. Furthermore, any attempt to incriminate the pilots does not consider that they are part of a broader system, which in turn may be accountable for their fatigue, work pressure, or lack of training. The International Civil Aviation Organization (ICAO), and its member states, therefore adopted James Reason's model of causation in 1993 in an effort to better understand the role of human factors in aviation accidents.

Pilot error is nevertheless a major cause of air accidents. In 2004, it was identified as the primary reason for 78.6% of disastrous general aviation (GA) accidents, and as the major cause of 75.5% of GA accidents in the United States. There are multiple factors that can cause pilot error; mistakes in the decision-making process can be due to habitual tendencies, biases, as well as a breakdown in the processing of the information coming in. For aircraft pilots, in extreme circumstances these errors are highly likely to result in fatalities.

== Causes of pilot error ==
Pilots work in complex environments and are routinely exposed to high amounts of situational stress in the workplace, inducing pilot error which may result in a threat to flight safety. While aircraft accidents are infrequent, they are highly visible and often involve significant numbers of fatalities. For this reason, research on causal factors and methodologies of mitigating risk associated with pilot error is exhaustive. Pilot error results from physiological and psychological limitations inherent in humans. "Causes of error include fatigue, workload, and fear as well as cognitive overload, poor interpersonal communications, imperfect information processing, and flawed decision making." Throughout the course of every flight, crews are intrinsically subjected to a variety of external threats and commit a range of errors that have the potential to negatively impact the safety of the aircraft.

=== Threats ===
The term "threat" is defined as any event "external to flight crew's influence which can increase the operational complexity of a flight." Threats may further be broken down into environmental threats and airline threats. Environmental threats are ultimately out of the hands of crew members and the airline, as they hold no influence on "adverse weather conditions, air traffic control shortcomings, bird strikes, and high terrain." Conversely, airline threats are not manageable by the flight crew, but may be controlled by the airline's management. These threats include "aircraft malfunctions, cabin interruptions, operational pressure, ground/ramp errors/events, cabin events and interruptions, ground maintenance errors, and inadequacies of manuals and charts."

=== Errors ===
The term "error" is defined as any action or inaction leading to deviation from team or organizational intentions. Error stems from physiological and psychological human limitations such as illness, medication, stress, alcohol/drug abuse, fatigue, emotion, etc. Error is inevitable in humans and is primarily related to operational and behavioral mishaps. Errors can vary from incorrect altimeter setting and deviations from flight course, to more severe errors such as exceeding maximum structural speeds or forgetting to put down landing or takeoff flaps.

=== Decision making ===
Reasons for negative reporting of accidents include staff being too busy, confusing data entry forms, lack of training and less education, lack of feedback to staff on reported data and punitive organizational cultures. Wiegmann and Shappell invented three cognitive models to analyze approximately 4,000 pilot factors associated with more than 2,000 U.S. Navy aviation mishaps. Although the three cognitive models have slight differences in the types of errors, all three lead to the same conclusion: errors in judgment. The three steps are decision-making, goal-setting, and strategy-selection errors, all of which were highly related to primary accidents. For example, on 28 December 2014, AirAsia Flight 8501, which was carrying seven crew members and 155 passengers, crashed into the Java Sea due to several fatal mistakes made by the captain in the poor weather conditions. In this case, the captain chose to exceed the maximum climb rate for a commercial aircraft, which caused a critical stall from which he was unable to recover.

== Threat and error management (TEM) ==
TEM involves the effective detection and response to internal or external factors that have the potential to degrade the safety of an aircraft's operations. Methods of teaching TEM stress replicability, or reliability of performance across recurring situations. TEM aims to prepare crews with the "coordinative and cognitive ability to handle both routine and unforeseen surprises and anomalies." The desired outcome of TEM training is the development of 'resilience'. Resilience, in this context, is the ability to recognize and act adaptively to disruptions which may be encountered during flight operations. TEM training occurs in various forms, with varying levels of success. Some of these training methods include data collection using the line operations safety audit (LOSA), implementation of crew resource management (CRM), cockpit task management (CTM), and the integrated use of checklists in both commercial and general aviation. Some other resources built into most modern aircraft that help minimize risk and manage threat and error are airborne collision and avoidance systems (ACAS) and ground proximity warning systems (GPWS). With the consolidation of onboard computer systems and the implementation of proper pilot training, airlines and crew members look to mitigate the inherent risks associated with human factors.

=== Line operations safety audit (LOSA) ===
LOSA is a structured observational program designed to collect data for the development and improvement of countermeasures to operational errors. Through the audit process, trained observers are able to collect information regarding the normal procedures, protocol, and decision making processes flight crews undertake when faced with threats and errors during normal operation. This data driven analysis of threat and error management is useful for examining pilot behavior in relation to situational analysis. It provides a basis for further implementation of safety procedures or training to help mitigate errors and risks. Observers on flights which are being audited typically observe the following:

- Potential threats to safety
- How the threats are addressed by the crew members
- The errors the threats generate
- How crew members manage these errors (action or inaction)
- Specific behaviors known to be associated with aviation accidents and incidents

LOSA was developed to assist crew resource management practices in reducing human error in complex flight operations. LOSA produces beneficial data that reveals how many errors or threats are encountered per flight, the number of errors which could have resulted in a serious threat to safety, and correctness of crew action or inaction. This data has proven to be useful in the development of CRM techniques and identification of what issues need to be addressed in training.

=== Crew resource management (CRM) ===
CRM is the "effective use of all available resources by individuals and crews to safely and effectively accomplish a mission or task, as well as identifying and managing the conditions that lead to error." CRM training has been integrated and mandatory for most pilot training programs, and has been the accepted standard for developing human factors skills for air crews and airlines. Although there is no universal CRM program, airlines usually customize their training to best suit the needs of the organization. The principles of each program are usually closely aligned. According to the U.S. Navy, there are seven critical CRM skills:

- Decision making – the use of logic and judgement to make decisions based on available information
- Assertiveness – willingness to participate and state a given position until convinced by facts that another option is more correct
- Mission analysis – ability to develop short and long term contingency plans
- Communication – clear and accurate sending and receiving of information, instructions, commands and useful feedback
- Leadership – ability to direct and coordinate activities of pilots & crew members
- Adaptability/flexibility – ability to alter course of action due to changing situations or availability of new information
- Situational awareness – ability to perceive the environment within time and space, and comprehend its meaning

These seven skills comprise the critical foundation for effective aircrew coordination. With the development and use of these core skills, flight crews "highlight the importance of identifying human factors and team dynamics to reduce human errors that lead to aviation mishaps."

==== Application and effectiveness of CRM ====
Since the implementation of CRM circa 1979, following the need for increased research on resource management by NASA, the aviation industry has seen tremendous evolution of the application of CRM training procedures. The applications of CRM has been developed in a series of generations:

- First generation: emphasized individual psychology and testing, where corrections could be made to behavior.
- Second generation: featured a shift in focus to cockpit group dynamics.
- Third evolution: diversification of scope and an emphasis on training crews in how they must function both in and out of the cockpit.
- Fourth generation: CRM integrated procedure into training, allowing organizations to tailor training to their needs.
- Fifth generation (current): acknowledges that human error is inevitable and provides information to improve safety standards.

Today, CRM is implemented through pilot and crew training sessions, simulations, and through interactions with senior ranked personnel and flight instructors such as briefing and debriefing flights. Although it is difficult to measure the success of CRM programs, studies have been conclusive that there is a correlation between CRM programs and better risk management.

=== Cockpit task management (CTM) ===
Multiple sources of information can be taken from one interface here, known as the PFD, or primary flight display from which pilots receive all of the most important data readings

Cockpit task management (CTM) is the "management level activity pilots perform as they initiate, monitor, prioritize, and terminate cockpit tasks." A 'task' is defined as a process performed to achieve a goal (i.e. fly to a waypoint, descend to a desired altitude). CTM training focuses on teaching crew members how to handle concurrent tasks which compete for their attention. This includes the following processes:

- Task initiation – when appropriate conditions exist
- Task monitoring – assessment of task progress and status
- Task prioritization – relative to the importance and urgency for safety
- Resource allocation – assignment of human and machine resources to tasks which need completion
- Task interruption – suspension of lower priority tasks for resources to be allocated to higher priority tasks
- Task resumption – continuing previously interrupted tasks
- Task termination – the completion or incompletion of tasks

The need for CTM training is a result of the capacity of human attentional facilities and the limitations of working memory. Crew members may devote more mental or physical resources to a particular task which demands priority or requires the immediate safety of the aircraft. CTM has been integrated to pilot training and goes hand in hand with CRM. Some aircraft operating systems have made progress in aiding CTM by combining instrument gauges into one screen. An example of this is a digital attitude indicator, which simultaneously shows the pilot the heading, airspeed, descent or ascent rate and a plethora of other pertinent information. Implementations such as these allow crews to gather multiple sources of information quickly and accurately, which frees up mental capacity to be focused on other, more prominent tasks.

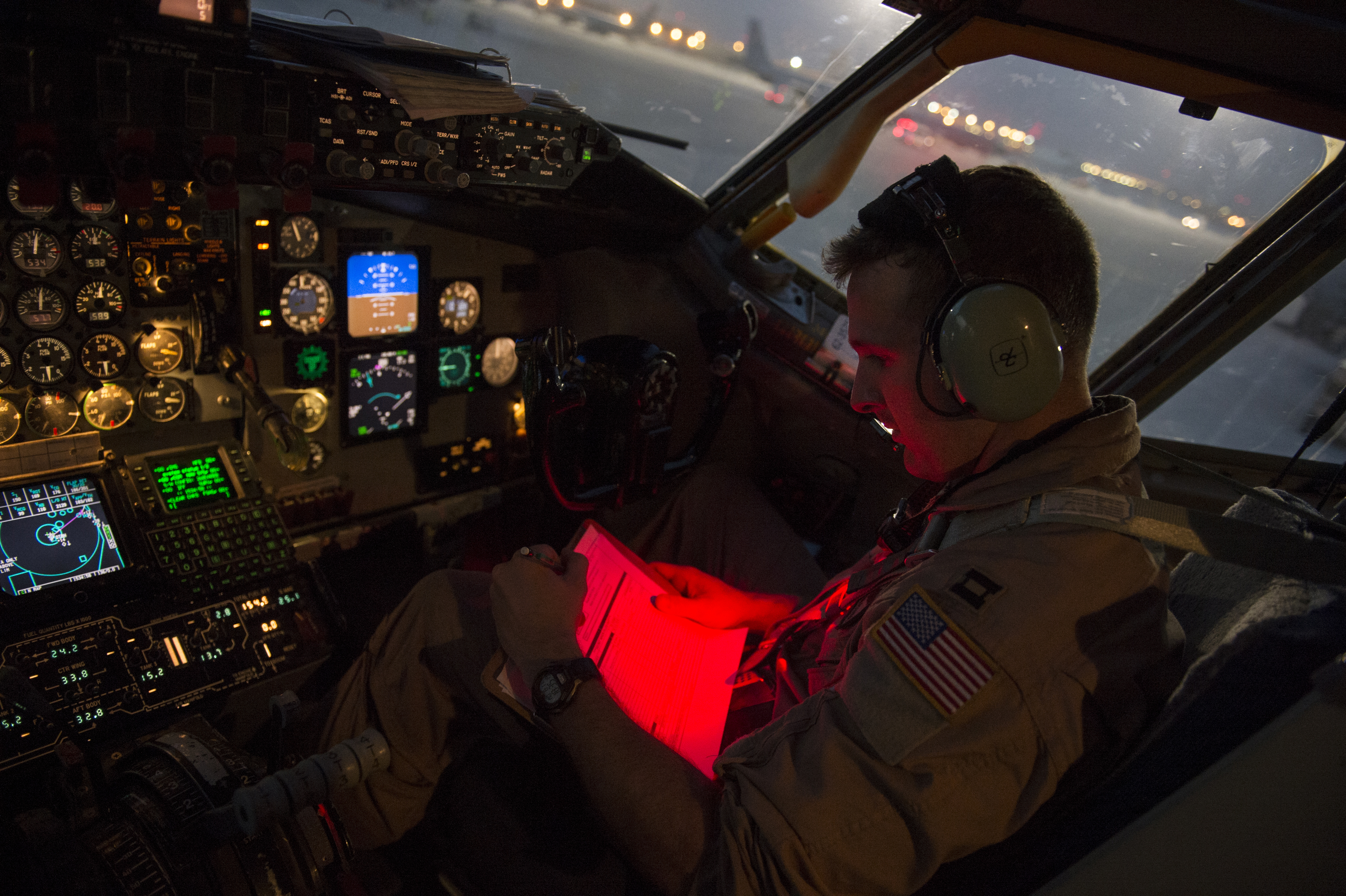
A military pilot reads the pre-flight checklist prior the mission. Checklists ensure that pilots are able to follow operational procedure and aid in memory recall.

=== Checklists ===
The use of checklists before, during and after flights has established a strong presence in all types of aviation as a means of managing error and reducing the possibility of risk. Checklists are highly regulated and consist of protocols and procedures for the majority of the actions required during a flight. The objectives of checklists include "memory recall, standardization and regulation of processes or methodologies." The use of checklists in aviation has become an industry standard practice, and the completion of checklists from memory is considered a violation of protocol and pilot error. Studies have shown that increased errors in judgement and cognitive function of the brain, along with changes in memory function are a few of the effects of stress and fatigue. Both of these are inevitable human factors encountered in the commercial aviation industry. The use of checklists in emergency situations also contributes to troubleshooting and reverse examining the chain of events which may have led to the particular incident or crash. Apart from checklists issued by regulatory bodies such as the FAA or ICAO, or checklists made by aircraft manufacturers, pilots also have personal qualitative checklists aimed to ensure their fitness and ability to fly the aircraft. An example is the IM SAFE checklist (illness, medication, stress, alcohol, fatigue/food, emotion) and a number of other qualitative assessments which pilots may perform before or during a flight to ensure the safety of the aircraft and passengers. These checklists, along with a number of other redundancies integrated into most modern aircraft operation systems, ensure the pilot remains vigilant, and in turn, aims to reduce the risk of pilot error.

== Notable examples ==
One of the most famous examples of an aircraft disaster that was attributed to pilot error was the night-time crash of Eastern Air Lines Flight 401 near Miami, Florida on 29 December 1972. The captain, first officer, and flight engineer had become fixated on a faulty landing gear light and had failed to realize that one of the crew had accidentally bumped the flight controls, altering the autopilot settings from level flight to a slow descent. Told by ATC to hold over a sparsely populated area away from the airport while they dealt with the problem (with, as a result, very few lights visible on the ground to act as an external reference), the distracted flight crew did not notice the plane losing height and the aircraft eventually struck the ground in the Everglades, killing 101 of the 176 passengers and crew. The subsequent National Transportation Safety Board (NTSB) report on the incident blamed the flight crew for failing to monitor the aircraft's instruments properly. Details of the incident are now frequently used as a case study in training exercises by aircrews and air traffic controllers.

During 2004 in the United States, pilot error was listed as the primary cause of 78.6% of fatal general aviation accidents, and as the primary cause of 75.5% of general aviation accidents overall. For scheduled air transport, pilot error typically accounts for just over half of worldwide accidents with a known cause.

- 28 July 1945 – A United States Army Air Forces B-25 bomber bound for Newark Airport crashed into the 79th floor of the Empire State Building after the pilot became lost in a heavy fog bank over Manhattan. All three crewmen were killed as well as eleven office workers in the building.
- 24 December 1958 – BOAC Bristol Britannia 312, registration G-AOVD, crashed as a result of a controlled flight into terrain (CFIT), near Winkton, England, while on a test flight. The crash was caused by a combination of bad weather and a failure on the part of both pilots to read the altimeter correctly. The first officer and two other people survived the crash.
- 3 January 1961 – Aero Flight 311 crashed near Kvevlax, Finland. All twenty-five occupants were killed in the accident, which was the deadliest in Finnish history. An investigation later determined that both pilots were intoxicated during the flight, and may have been interrupted by a passenger at the time of the crash.
- 28 February 1966 – American astronauts Elliot See and Charles Bassett were killed when their T-38 Talon crashed into a building at Lambert–St. Louis International Airport during bad weather. A NASA investigation concluded that See had been flying too low on his landing approach.
- 5 May 1972 – Alitalia Flight 112 crashed into Mount Longa after the flight crew did not adhere to approach procedures established by ATC. All 115 occupants perished. This is the worst single-aircraft disaster in Italian history.
- 29 December 1972 – Eastern Air Lines Flight 401 crashed into the Florida Everglades after the flight crew failed to notice the deactivation of the plane's autopilot, having been distracted by their own attempts to solve a problem with the landing gear. Out of 176 occupants, 75 survived the crash.
- 27 March 1977 – The Tenerife airport disaster: a senior KLM pilot failed to hear, understand or follow instructions from the control tower, causing two Boeing 747s to collide on the runway at Tenerife. A total of 583 people were killed in the deadliest aviation accident in history.
- 28 December 1978 – United Airlines Flight 173: a flight simulator instructor captain allowed his Douglas DC-8 to run out of fuel while investigating a landing gear problem, causing a crash that killed ten of those on board. United Airlines subsequently changed their policy to disallow "simulator instructor time" in calculating a pilot's "total flight time". It was thought that a contributory factor to the accident is that an instructor can control the amount of fuel in simulator training so that it never runs out.
- 13 January 1982 – Air Florida Flight 90, a Boeing 737-200 with 79 passengers and crew, crashed into the 14th Street Bridge and careened into the Potomac River shortly after taking off from Washington National Airport, killing 74 passengers and crew, and four motorists on the bridge. The NTSB report blamed the flight crew for not properly employing the plane's de-icing system.
- 19 February 1985 – The crew of China Airlines Flight 006 lost control of their Boeing 747SP over the Pacific Ocean, after the No. 4 engine flamed out. The aircraft descended 30,000 feet in two-and-a-half minutes before control was regained. There were no fatalities but there were several injuries, and the aircraft was badly damaged.
- 16 August 1987 – The crew of Northwest Airlines Flight 255 omitted their taxi checklist and failed to deploy the aircraft's flaps and slats. Subsequently, the McDonnell Douglas MD-82 did not gain enough lift on takeoff and crashed into the ground, killing all but one of the 155 people on board, as well as two people on the ground. The sole survivor was a four-year-old girl named Cecelia Cichan, who was seriously injured.
- 28 August 1988 – The Ramstein air show disaster: a member of an Italian aerobatic team misjudged a maneuver, causing a mid-air collision. Three pilots and 67 spectators on the ground were killed.
- 31 August 1988 – Delta Air Lines Flight 1141 crashed on takeoff after the crew forgot to deploy the flaps for increased lift. Of the 108 passengers and crew on board, fourteen were killed.
- 8 January 1989 – In the Kegworth air disaster, a fan blade broke off in the left engine of a new Boeing 737-400, but the pilots mistakenly shut down the right engine. The left engine eventually failed completely and the crew were unable to restart the right engine before the aircraft crashed. Instrumentation on the 737-400 was different from earlier models, but no flight simulator for the new model was available in Britain.
- 3 September 1989 – The crew of Varig Flight 254 made a series of mistakes so that their Boeing 737 ran out of fuel hundreds of miles off-course above the Amazon jungle. Thirteen died in the ensuing crash landing.
- 21 October 1989 – TAN-SAHSA Flight 414 crashed into a hill near Toncontin International Airport in Tegucigalpa, Honduras, because of a bad landing procedure by the pilot, killing 131 of the 146 passengers and crew.
- 14 February 1990 – Indian Airlines Flight 605 crashed into a golf course short of the runway near Hindustan Airport, Bangalore, India. The flight crew failed to pull up after radio callouts of how close they were into the ground. The plane struck a golf course and an embankment, bursting into flames. Of the 146 occupants on the plane, 92 died, including both flight crew. 54 occupants survived the crash.
- 24 November 1992 – China Southern Airlines Flight 3943 departed Guangzhou on a 55-minute flight to Guilin. During the descent towards Guilin, at an altitude of 7,000 feet (2,100 m), the captain attempted to level off the plane by raising the nose and the plane's auto-throttle was engaged for descent. However, the crew failed to notice that the number 2 power lever was at idle, which led to an asymmetrical power condition. The plane crashed on descent to Guilin Airport, killing all 141 on board.
- 23 March 1994 – Aeroflot Flight 593, an Airbus A310-300, crashed on its way to Hong Kong. The captain, Yaroslav Kudrinsky, invited his two children into the cockpit, and permitted them to sit at the controls, against airline regulations. His sixteen-year-old son, Eldar Kudrinsky, accidentally disconnected the autopilot, causing the plane to bank to the right before diving. The co-pilot brought up the plane too far, causing it to stall and start a flat spin. The pilots eventually recovered the plane, but it crashed into a forest, killing all 75 people on board.
- 24 June 1994 – B-52 crashes in Fairchild Air Force Base. The crash was largely attributed to the personality and behavior of Lt Col Arthur "Bud" Holland, the pilot in command, and delayed reactions to the earlier incidents involving this pilot. After past histories, Lt Col Mark McGeehan, a USAF squadron commander, refused to allow any of his squadron members to fly with Holland unless he (McGeehan) was also on the aircraft. This crash is now used in military and civilian aviation environments as a case study in teaching crew resource management.
- 30 June 1994 – Airbus Industrie Flight 129, a certification test flight of the Airbus A330-300, crashed at Toulouse-Blagnac Airport. While simulating an engine-out emergency just after takeoff with an extreme center of gravity location, the pilots chose improper manual settings which rendered the autopilot incapable of keeping the plane in the air, and by the time the captain regained manual control, it was too late. The aircraft was destroyed, killing the flight crew, a test engineer, and four passengers. The investigative board concluded that the captain was overworked from earlier flight testing that day, and was unable to devote sufficient time to the preflight briefing. As a result, Airbus had to revise the engine-out emergency procedures.
- 2 July 1994 – USAir Flight 1016 crashed into a residential house due to spatial disorientation. 37 passengers were killed and the airplane was destroyed.
- 20 December 1995 – American Airlines Flight 965, a Boeing 757-200 with 155 passengers and eight crew members, departed Miami approximately two hours behind schedule at 1835 Eastern Standard Time (EST). The investigators believe that the pilot's unfamiliarity with the modern technology installed in the Boeing 757-200 may have played a role. The pilots did not know their location in relation to a radio beacon in Tulua. The aircraft was equipped to provide that information electronically, but according to sources familiar with the investigation, the pilot apparently did not know how to access the information. The captain input the wrong coordinates, and the aircraft crashed into the mountains, killing 159 of the 163 people on board.
- 8 May 1997 – China Southern Airlines Flight 3456 crashed into the runway at Shenzhen Huangtian Airport during the crew's second go-around attempt, killing 35 of the 74 people on board. The crew had unknowingly violated landing procedures, due to heavy weather.
- 6 August 1997 – Korean Air Flight 801, a Boeing 747-300, crashed into Nimitz Hill, three miles from Guam International Airport, killing 228 of the 254 people on board. The captain's failure to properly conduct a non-precision approach contributed to the accident. The NTSB said pilot fatigue was a possible factor.
- 26 September 1997 – Garuda Indonesia Flight 152, an Airbus A300, crashed into a ravine, killing all 234 people on board. The NTSC concluded that the crash was caused when the pilots turned the aircraft in the wrong direction, along with ATC error. Low visibility and failure of the GPWS to activate were cited as contributing factors to the accident.
- 12 October 1997 – Singer John Denver died when his newly-acquired Rutan Long-EZ home-built aircraft crashed into the Pacific Ocean off Pacific Grove, California. The NTSB indicated that Denver lost control of the aircraft while attempting to manipulate the fuel selector handle, which had been placed in an inaccessible position by the aircraft's builder. The NTSB cited Denver's unfamiliarity with the aircraft's design as a cause of the crash.
- 16 February 1998 – China Airlines Flight 676 was attempting to land at Chiang Kai-Shek International Airport but had initiated a go-around due to the bad weather conditions. However, the pilots accidentally disengaged the autopilot and did not notice for 11 seconds. When they did notice, the Airbus A300 had entered a stall. The aircraft crashed into a highway and residential area, and exploded, killing all 196 people on board, as well as six people on the ground.
- 16 July 1999 – John F. Kennedy Jr. died when his plane, a Piper Saratoga, crashed into the Atlantic Ocean off the coast of Martha's Vineyard, Massachusetts. The NTSB officially declared that the crash was caused by "the pilot's failure to maintain control of his airplane during a descent over water at night, which was a result of spatial disorientation". Kennedy did not hold a certification for IFR flight, but did continue to fly after weather conditions obscured visual landmarks.
- 31 August 1999 – Lineas Aéreas Privadas Argentinas (LAPA) flight 3142 crashed after an attempted take-off with the flaps retracted, killing 63 of the 100 occupants on the plane as well as two people on the ground.
- 31 October 2000 – Singapore Airlines Flight 006 was a Boeing 747-412 that took off from the wrong runway at the then Chiang Kai-Shek International Airport. It collided with construction equipment on the runway, bursting into flames and killing 83 of its 179 occupants.
- 12 November 2001 – American Airlines Flight 587 encountered heavy turbulence and the co-pilot over-applied the rudder pedal, turning the Airbus A300 from side to side. The excessive stress caused the rudder to fail. The A300 spun and hit a residential area, crushing five houses and killing 265 people. Contributing factors included wake turbulence and pilot training.
- 24 November 2001 – Crossair Flight 3597 crashed into a forest on approach to runway 28 at Zurich Airport. This was caused by Captain Lutz descending below the minimum safe altitude of 2400 feet on approach to the runway.
- 15 April 2002 – Air China Flight 129, a Boeing 767-200, crashed near Busan, South Korea killing 128 of the 166 people on board. The pilot and co-pilot had been flying too low.
- 25 October 2002 – Eight people, including U.S. Senator Paul Wellstone, were killed in a crash near Eveleth, Minnesota. The NTSB concluded that "the flight crew did not monitor and maintain minimum speed.
- 3 January 2004 – Flash Airlines Flight 604 dived into the Red Sea shortly after takeoff, killing all 148 people on board. The captain had been experiencing vertigo and had not noticed that his control column was slanted to the right. The Boeing 737 banked until it was no longer able to stay in the air. However, the investigation report was disputed.
- 26 February 2004 – A Beech 200 carrying Macedonian President Boris Trajkovski crashed, killing the president and eight other passengers. The crash investigation ruled that the accident was caused by "procedural mistakes by the crew" during the landing approach.
- 14 August 2005 – The pilots of Helios Airways Flight 522 lost consciousness, most likely due to hypoxia caused by failure to switch the cabin pressurization to "Auto" during the pre-flight preparations. The Boeing 737-300 crashed after running out of fuel, killing all on board.
- 16 August 2005 – The crew of West Caribbean Airways Flight 708 unknowingly (and dangerously) decreased the speed of the McDonnell Douglas MD-82, causing it to enter a stall. The situation was incorrectly handled by the crew, with the captain believing that the engines had flamed out, while the first officer, who was aware of the stall, attempted to correct him. The aircraft crashed into the ground near Machiques, Venezuela, killing all 160 people on board.
- 3 May 2006 – Armavia Flight 967 lost control and crashed into the Black Sea while approaching Sochi-Adler Airport in Russia, killing all 113 people on board. The pilots were fatigued and flying under stressful conditions. Their stress levels were pushed over the limit, causing them to lose their situational awareness.
- 27 August 2006 – Comair Flight 5191 failed to become airborne and crashed at Blue Grass Airport, after the flight crew mistakenly attempted to take off from a secondary runway that was much shorter than the intended takeoff runway. All but one of the 50 people on board the plane died, including the 47 passengers. The sole survivor was the flight's first officer, James Polhinke.
- 1 January 2007 – The crew of Adam Air Flight 574 were preoccupied with a malfunction of the inertial reference system, which diverted their attention from the flight instruments, allowing the increasing descent and bank angle to go unnoticed. Appearing to have become spatially disoriented, the pilots did not detect and appropriately arrest the descent soon enough to prevent loss of control. This caused the aircraft to break up in mid air and crash into the water, killing all 102 people on board.
- 7 March 2007 – Garuda Indonesia Flight 200: poor crew resource management and the failure to extend the flaps led the aircraft to land at an "unimaginable" speed and run off the end of the runway after landing. Of the 140 occupants, 22 were killed.
- 17 July 2007 – TAM Airlines Flight 3054: the thrust reverser on the right engine of the Airbus A320 was jammed. Although both crew members were aware, the captain used an outdated braking procedure, and the aircraft overshot the runway and crashed into a building, killing all 187 people on board, as well as 12 people on the ground.
- 20 August 2008 – The crew of Spanair Flight 5022 failed to deploy the MD-82's flaps and slats. The flight crashed after takeoff, killing 154 out of the 172 passengers and crew on board.
- 12 February 2009 – Colgan Air Flight 3407 (flying as Continental Connection) entered a stall and crashed into a house in Clarence Center, New York, due to lack of situational awareness of air speed by the captain and first officer and the captain's improper reaction to the plane's stick-shaker stall warning system. All 49 people on board the plane died, as well as one person inside the house.
- 1 June 2009 – Air France Flight 447 entered a stall and crashed into the Atlantic Ocean following pitot tube failures and improper control inputs by the first officer. All 216 passengers and twelve crew members died.
- 10 April 2010 – 2010 Polish Air Force Tu-154 crash: during a descent towards Russia's Smolensk North Airport, the flight crew of the Polish presidential jet ignored automatic warnings and attempted a risky landing in heavy fog. The Tupolev Tu-154M descended too low and crashed into a nearby forest; all of the occupants were killed, including Polish president Lech Kaczynski, his wife Maria Kaczynska, and numerous government and military officials.
- 12 May 2010 – Afriqiyah Airways Flight 771 The aircraft crashed about 1,200 meters (1,300 yd; 3,900 ft) short of Runway 09, outside the perimeter of Tripoli International Airport, killing all but one of the 104 people on board. The sole survivor was a 9-year-old boy named Ruben Van Assouw. On 28 February 2013, the Libyan Civil Aviation Authority announced that the crash was caused by pilot error. Factors that contributed to the crash were lacking/insufficient crew resource management, sensory illusions, and the first officer's inputs to the aircraft side stick; fatigue could also have played a role in the accident. The final report cited the following causes: the pilots' lack of a common action plan during the approach, the final approach being continued below the Minimum Decision Altitude without ground visual reference being acquired; the inappropriate application of flight control inputs during the go-around and after the Terrain Awareness and Warning System had been activated; and the flight crew's failure to monitor and control the flight path.
- 22 May 2010 – Air India Express Flight 812 overshot the runway at Mangalore Airport, killing 158 people. The plane touched down 610 meters (670 yd) from the usual touchdown point after a steep descent. CVR recordings showed that the captain had been sleeping and had woken up just minutes before the landing. His lack of alertness made the plane land very quickly and steeply and it ran off the end of the tabletop runway.
- 28 July 2010 – The captain of Airblue Flight 202 became confused with the heading knob and thought that he had carried out the correct action to turn the plane. However, due to his failure to pull the heading knob, the turn was not executed. The Airbus A321 went astray and slammed into the Margalla Hills, killing all 152 people on board.
- 20 June 2011 – RusAir Flight 9605 crashed onto a motorway while on its final approach to Petrozavodsk Airport in western Russia, after the intoxicated navigator encouraged the captain to land in heavy fog. Only five of the 52 people on board the plane survived the crash.
- 6 July 2013 – Asiana Airlines Flight 214 tail struck the seawall short of runway 28L at San Francisco International Airport. Of the 307 passengers and crew, three people died and 187 were injured when the aircraft slid down the runway. Investigators said the accident was caused by the Captain misreading the runway, leading to an incident.
- 23 July 2014 – TransAsia Airways Flight 222 brushed trees and crashed into six houses in a residential area in Xixi Village, Penghu Island, Taiwan. Of the 58 people on board the flight, only ten people survived the crash. The captain was overconfident with his skill and intentionally descended and rolled the plane to the left. Crew members did not realize that they were at a dangerously low altitude and the plane was about to impact terrain until two seconds before the crash.
- 28 December 2014 – Indonesia AirAsia Flight 8501 crashed into the Java Sea as a result of an aerodynamic stall due to pilot error. The aircraft exceeded the climb rate, way beyond its operational limits. All 155 passengers and 7 crew members on board were killed.
- 6 February 2015 – TransAsia Airways Flight 235: one of the ATR 72's engines experienced a flameout. As airplanes are able to fly on one engine alone, the pilot then shut down one of the engines. However, he accidentally shut off the engine that was functioning correctly and left the plane powerless, at which point he unsuccessfully tried to restart both engines. The plane then clipped a bridge and plummeted into the Keelung river as the pilot tried to avoid city terrain, killing 43 of the 58 on board.

== See also ==
- Airmanship
- Controlled flight into terrain
- Environmental causes of aviation stress
- Human factors in aviation safety
- Human reliability
- Jet lag
- Pilot fatigue
- Sensory illusions in aviation
- Spatial disorientation
- Stress in the aviation industry
- Threat and error management
- User error
