= Propadu Konair Tarahubun =

Company of Indonesia

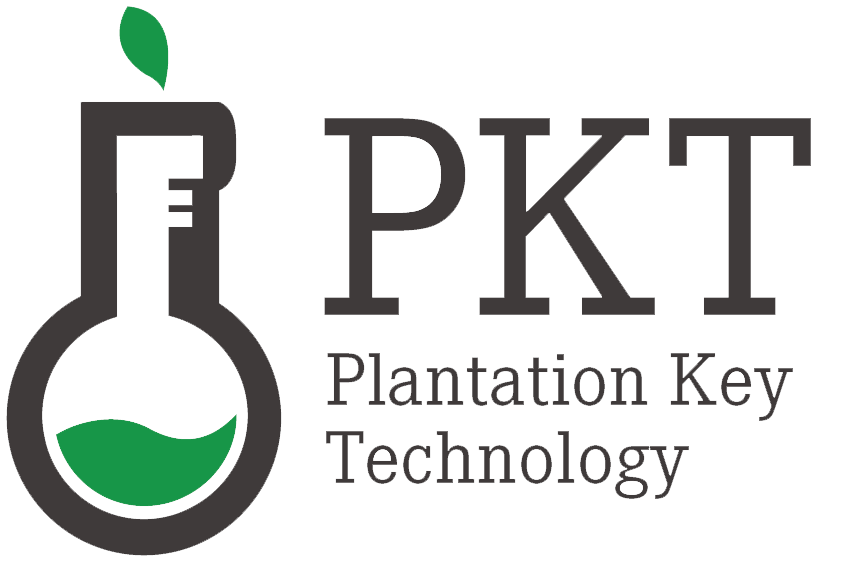
- PT. PKT
- Company type: Subsidiary
- Industry: fertilizer
- Founders: Supeno Surija
- Headquarters: medan, North Sumatra
- Area served: Worldwide
- Key people: Supeno Surija (CEO)
- Parent: Independent (1990–2016)
- Website: plantationkeytechnology.com

PT Propadu Konair Tarahubun (PT PKT) is a subsidiary of Plantation Key Technology Group based in Medan, North Sumatra Indonesia. which is engaged in the manufacture of fertilizers. Since its establishment, PT PKT has been working on Integrated Conservation Program of Water, Soil, Air and Plantation which serves to incorporate models of sustainable development into every practice of plantation.

== Members ==
1. Roundtable on Sustainable Palm Oil
2. Institute Of Nano Technology
3. Biopesticide industry alliance
4. International Competence centre for Organic Agriculture

== Accreditation, Awards, and Certifications ==
- 2005 – International Professional of the Year 2005 for the discovery of Dioxin Free System for the discovery of Dioxin Free from IBC Cambridge, England.
- 2008 – ”Sistem Dioxin-Free” untuk pelestarian lingkungan hidup for the discovery of Dioxin Free System as the national pride of the invention to the world of Indonesian World Record Museum (Muri).
