= Garuda Indonesia Flight 152 =

1997 aviation accident in Indonesia

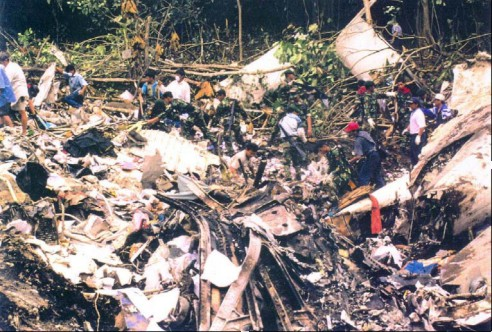
- Wreckage of the aircraft

Accident
- Date: 26 September 1997
- Summary: Controlled flight into terrain in low visibility attributed to pilot error and ATC error.
- Site: Sibolangit, near Polonia International Airport, Medan, North Sumatra, Indonesia; 03°20′28.2″N 98°34′26.6″E

Aircraft
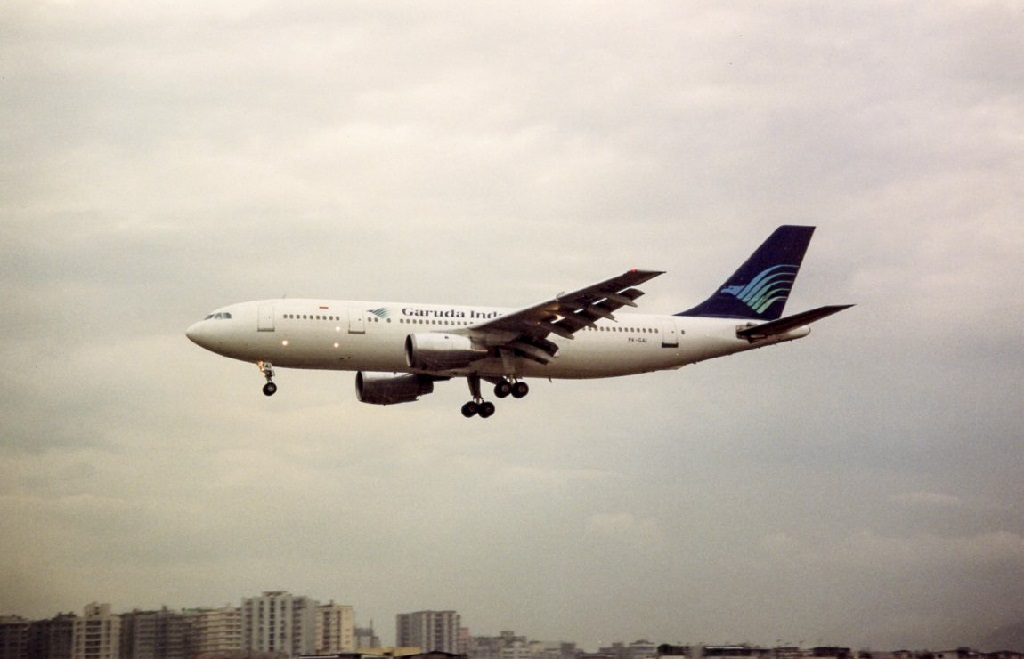
- PK-GAI, the aircraft involved in the accident, photographed in 1994
- Aircraft type: Airbus A300B4-220
- Operator: Garuda Indonesia
- IATA flight No.: GA152
- ICAO flight No.: GIA152
- Call sign: INDONESIA 152
- Registration: PK-GAI
- Flight origin: Soekarno–Hatta International Airport, Tangerang, Indonesia
- Destination: Polonia International Airport, Medan, North Sumatra, Indonesia
- Occupants: 234
- Passengers: 222
- Crew: 12
- Fatalities: 234
- Survivors: 0

Garuda Indonesia Flight 152 was a scheduled domestic flight operated by Garuda Indonesia from Soekarno–Hatta International Airport, Tangerang, Indonesia, to Polonia International Airport, Medan, Indonesia. On 26 September 1997, the Airbus A300 flying the route crashed into mountainous woodlands near the village of Buah Nabar, Sibolangit, killing all 222 passengers and 12 crew members on board. It is the deadliest aviation disaster in Indonesia's history, and the fourth-deadliest involving an Airbus A300.

== Aircraft ==
The aircraft was an Airbus A300B4 FFCC, or "forward-facing crew concept." The FFCC model is a modified version of the A300B4 in which the flight engineer station is eliminated, and the relevant controls are simplified and relocated to be positioned on the overhead panel between the two pilots. This control arrangement is similar to the Airbus A310 series, the difference being that the FFCC retains most of the analogue flight instrumentation of the original A300. The FFCC would later be developed into the A300-600 series, in which all elements of the flight deck are brought to A310 standards, including the addition of electronic flight instrumentation. The two pilots aboard the accident flight were qualified to fly both the FFCC and the -600 model, however the adequacy of their conversion training between the two would later be called into question.

The aircraft was delivered in 1982 and was powered by two Pratt & Whitney JT9D-59A turbofan engines and had flown over 27,000 hours (over 16,500 take-off and landing cycles) at the time of the accident.

== Accident ==
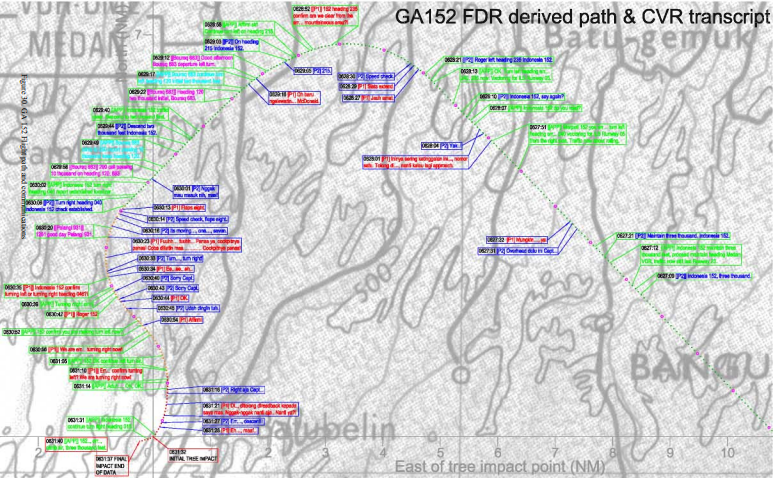
The flight path of Flight 152 with excerpts of the cockpit voice recorder (CVR) transcript

At 1:13 pm (local time), air traffic controllers in Medan cleared Flight 152 for an ILS approach to Runway 5 from its 316 degree heading. The crew, led by Captain Hance Rachmo Wiyogo (41), a pilot with 19 years of flying experience at Garuda Indonesia and nearly 12,000 flying hours, and First Officer Tata Zuwaldi (also 41), a former flight engineer who recently upgraded to pilot, were instructed to turn left to a heading of 240 degrees so as to intercept the ILS localizer. Two minutes prior to impact, the crew was asked to turn further left, to 215 degrees. At 1:30 pm, Medan instructed the crew to descend to 2,000 feet (610 m), and to turn right heading 046 degrees to line up for arrival into runway 05, and asked the crew to report their heading. Air traffic controllers then became confused as to which plane they were talking to, as another flight with the same number (Merpati Nusantara Airlines Flight 152) was also in the area at the time.

Earlier in the day, another Flight 152, Merpati Nusantara Airlines Flight 152, was handled by the same air traffic controller. This led to the controller mistakenly saying "Merpati one five two turn left heading 240 to intercept runway zero five from the right side"; as the wrong call sign was used, the Garuda pilots disregarded these instructions. The controller, on not receiving a response, queried the pilots to get their attention, this time using the correct call sign, "Indonesia 152". The controller then repeated most of his instructions, but specifically failing to repeat that the flight would be making its approach on the south side of the runway, or right side. The pilots believed they were flying the approach on the north side of the airport, which reflected the information on the approach chart the pilots were using. Thus, when the pilots were instructed to turn right to a heading of 046 maintaining 2,000 feet (610 m) to capture the localizer for the ILS to runway 05, out of habit – or possibly due to the detailed approach chart – the captain initiated a left turn to a heading of 046. The First Officer was distracted during the turn and did not notice for a while that the aircraft was turning left. When he did notice, he told the captain he was turning the wrong way, and the captain questioned the controller over which way they needed to turn, to which the controller confirmed they were to turn right. A confusing conversation took place over which way to turn, with the controller not having a clear picture of what the flight was doing, due to being unaware that he had left out some critical instructions after his "Merpati 152" mistake and due to the Medan radar system having a refresh time of 12 seconds.

Without a constant up-to-date view of the flight's heading, the controller thought the plane was continuing left, when it was actually turning right and over high terrain. During this time the flight descended below 2,000 feet, probably due to the captain inputting the wrong altitude. The pilots did not notice this while they were focused on turning to the correct heading. Five seconds prior to initial impact with the treetops, the First Officer made a comment about the airplane's altitude. The FDR recorded increases in pitch and engine power, likely commanded by the crew in an effort to correct their altitude. Shortly before the recording ended, the cockpit voice recorder registered the sound of the plane striking trees, followed by shouting from the pilots. The aircraft crashed into a ravine 27 kilometres (15 nmi; 17 mi) from the runway 05 threshold, 18 kilometres (9.7 nmi; 11 mi) to the south of the center line. The aircraft hit the ground at 1:32 p.m., right wing low, turning towards the airport in the process at a heading of 230-240 degrees and an altitude of 1,550 feet (470 m) MSL. All 234 people on board were killed.

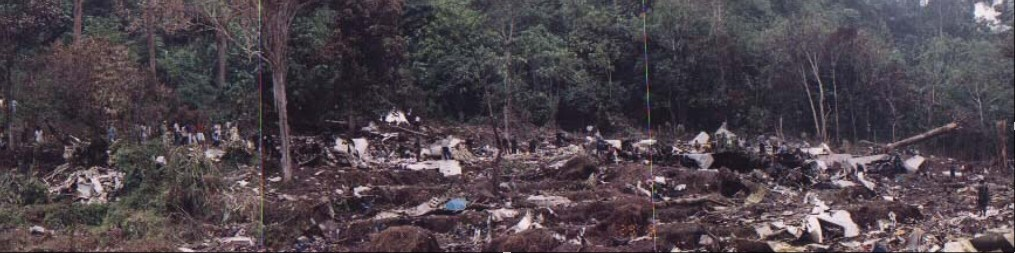
Panoramic view of the crash site

== Victims ==
The passengers were mostly Indonesian, but it also includes six Japanese, four German, three Taiwanese, two American, two British, two Canadian, two Ghanaian, one Australian, one Belgian, one Dutch, one French, one Italian, one Malaysian, one Pakistani, one South African and one Swedish national as well.

=== Nationalities of the passengers and crew ===
Nationality	Passengers	Crew	Total
Indonesia	180	12	192
Japan	6	0	6
Germany	4	0	4
Taiwan	3	0	3
Canada	2	0	2
Ghana	2	0	2
United States	2	0	2
United Kingdom	2	0	2
France	1	0	1
Italy	1	0	1
Malaysia	1	0	1
Netherlands	1	0	1
Australia	1	0	1
Pakistan	1	0	1
Sweden	1	0	1
South Africa	1	0	1
Belgium	1	0	1
Total (17 Nationalities)	222	12	234

=== Passenger remains ===
Forty-eight of the bodies recovered from the crash were never identified and were buried in a mass grave in a cemetery outside Medan's Polonia Airport, where 61 victims of the 1979 Garuda Fokker F28 crash were also buried. The remaining 186 bodies were identified and returned to their families for private burial.

== Investigation ==
The causes of the crash, according to the official report of the National Transportation Safety Committee (NTSC), were:

"There was confusion regarding turning direction of left turn instead of right turn at critical position during radar vectoring that reduced the flight crew's vertical awareness while they were concentrating on the aircraft's lateral changes. These caused the aircraft to continue descending below the assigned altitude of 2000 ft and hit treetops at 1550 ft above mean sea level."

The report also criticized the airline's conversion training for pilots who fly both the A300-600 and A300B4-FF models. The former is equipped with digital navigation displays, while the latter is equipped with analog equipment. Though both are sufficient for conducting instrument approaches, the captain may have been overwhelmed due to his lack of familiarity with the analog instrumentation.

Contributing to the accident was the failure of the Ground Proximity Warning System (GPWS) for undetermined reasons and the inadequate vectoring charts used by the controllers at Medan.

== Lawsuits ==
The first lawsuit was filed on September 24, 1998, on behalf of American passengers Fritz and Djoeminah Baden. Additional lawsuits were filed in state and federal courts in Chicago related to 26 more victims. The sole defendant in the lawsuits was Sundstrand Corporation (later Hamilton Sundstrand), the manufacturer of the GPWS. The plaintiffs alleged that the GPWS was defectively designed, that the manufacturer was aware of its deficiencies in mountainous terrain for over a decade, and had the system worked as designed the accident could have been avoided. Sundstrand disputed these claims and did not accept responsibility. Nearly six years after the crash the lawsuit was settled out of court.

A suit against Garuda Indonesia, brought by Joyce Coyle in Oregon (Coyle v. P.T. Garuda Indonesia) was dismissed on the grounds that the US court had no jurisdiction to hear a case about domestic flights operated by a government-owned airline in another country.

== Aftermath ==
Flights between Jakarta and Medan are now operated by flight numbers 118, 182, 184, 186, 188 and 190 (operating to Kualanamu International Airport as a successor for Polonia airport since 2013). As of January 2023, Garuda Indonesia continued to operate the flight number 152, now serving the route between Jakarta and Batam, using a Boeing 737-800.

== In Media ==
The crash of Garuda Indonesia Flight 152 is featured in the fifth episode of the Season 17 of Mayday (Air Crash Investigation). The episode is titled "Lethal Turn".

== See also ==
- List of accidents and incidents involving commercial aircraft
- 1997 Southeast Asian haze
- 1997 Indonesian forest fires
- Alitalia Flight 404, another plane crash on approach when the GPWS didn't sound and also caused by pilot error in a similar way.
- Air China Flight 129
- Dan-Air Flight 1008
- Korean Air Flight 801
- Air Inter Flight 148
- Thai Airways International Flight 311
- American Airlines Flight 965, another plane crash in which a major navigational error was made
- Intercontinental de Aviación Flight 256
- Cebu Pacific Flight 387
- Air Philippines Flight 541
