= Sibolangit =

District in Deli Serdang Regency, North Sumatra, Indonesia

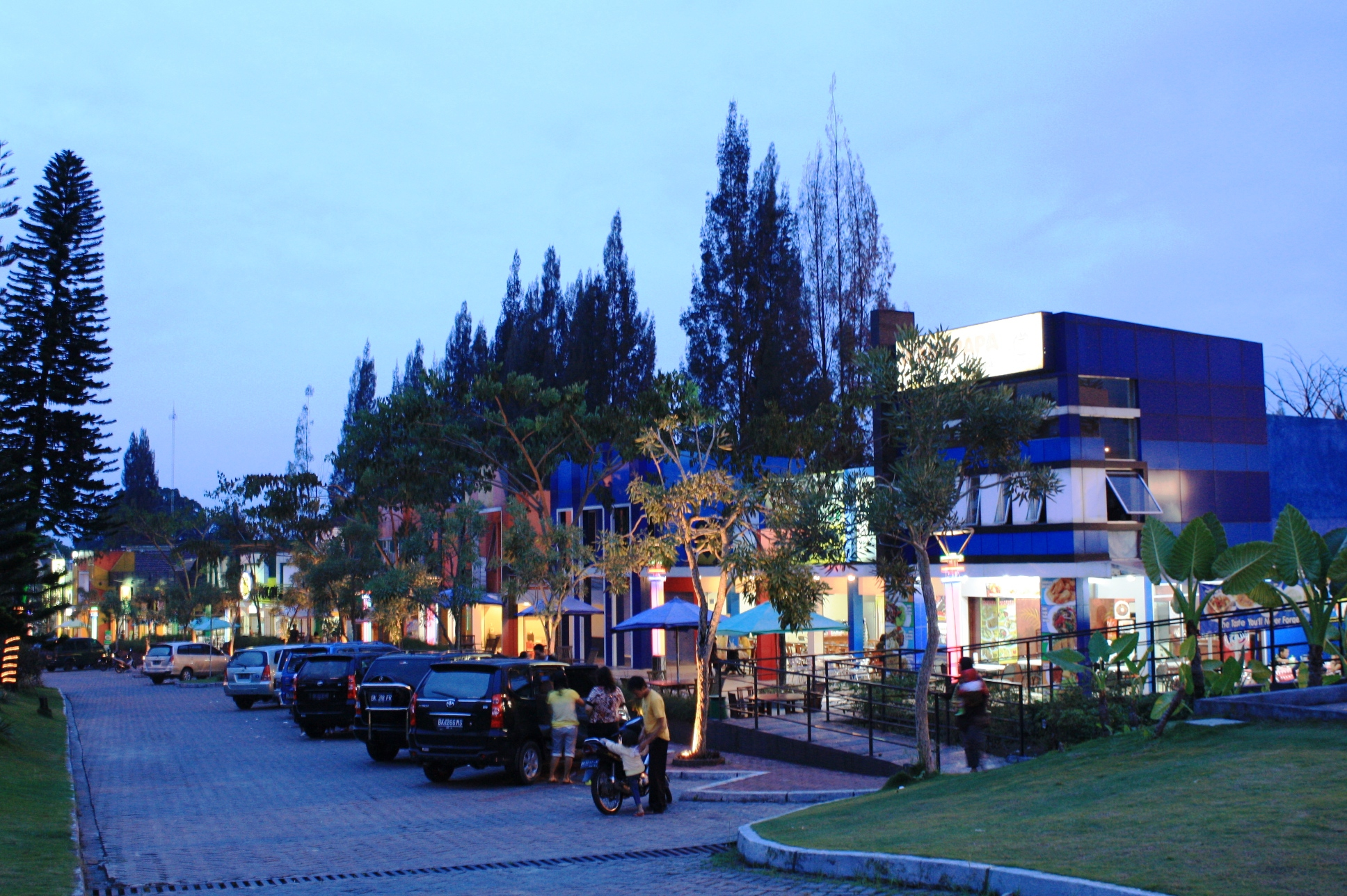
Green Hill theme park and residences, located in Sibolangit

Sibolangit is a district or kecamatan in the Deli Serdang Regency in the Indonesian province of North Sumatra. As of the 2020 census, it had a population of 19,980 and an area of 179.96 km^{2}; the official estimate as at mid 2024 was 21,946.

It is the site of the Two Colours Sibolangit Waterfall.

On 26 September 1997, Garuda Indonesia Flight 152 crashed into woodlands in Sibolangit killing all 234 people on board. On 16 May 2016, a total of 21 tourists were killed in Sibolangit when a flash flood struck them. 200 personnel were deployed by the Search and Rescue Agency.

== Villages ==
The 30 villages are listed with their populations as at mid 2024, all sharing the postcode of 20357.

Kode Wilayah	Name of village	Pop'n 2024 Estimate
12.07.03.2001	Bandar Baru	3,464
12.07.03.2002	Batu Layang	580
12.07.03.2003	Batu Mbelin	357
12.07.03.2004	Betimus Mbaru	372
12.07.03.2005	Bengkurung	374
12.07.03.2006	Bingkawan	858
12.07.03.2007	Buah Nabar	372
12.07.03.2008	Bukum	630
12.07.03.2009	Buluh Awar	387
12.07.03.2010	Cinta Rakyat	295
12.07.03.2011	Durin Serugun	691
12.07.03.2012	Ketangkuhen	532
12.07.03.2013	Kuala	360)
12.07.03.2014	Martelu	427
12.07.03.2015	Negri Gugung	320

Kode Wilayah	Name of village	Pop'n 2024 Estimate
12.07.03.2016	Puang Aja	382
12.07.03.2017	Rumah Kinangkung Suka Piring	396
12.07.03.2018	Rambung Baru	1,095
12.07.03.2019	Rumah Pil-Pil	1,156
12.07.03.2020	Rumah Sumbul	479
12.07.03.2021	Sala Bulan	396
12.07.03.2022	Sayum Sabah	738
12.07.03.2023	Sembahe	1,362
12.07.03.2024	Sibolangit (village)	735
12.07.03.2025	Sikeben	685
12.07.03.2026	Suka Maju	717
12.07.03.2027	Suka Makmur	2,366
12.07.03.2028	Tambunen	659
12.07.03.2029	Tanjung Beringin	306
12.07.03.2030	Ujung Deleng	225

== Sibolangit Nature Tourism Park ==
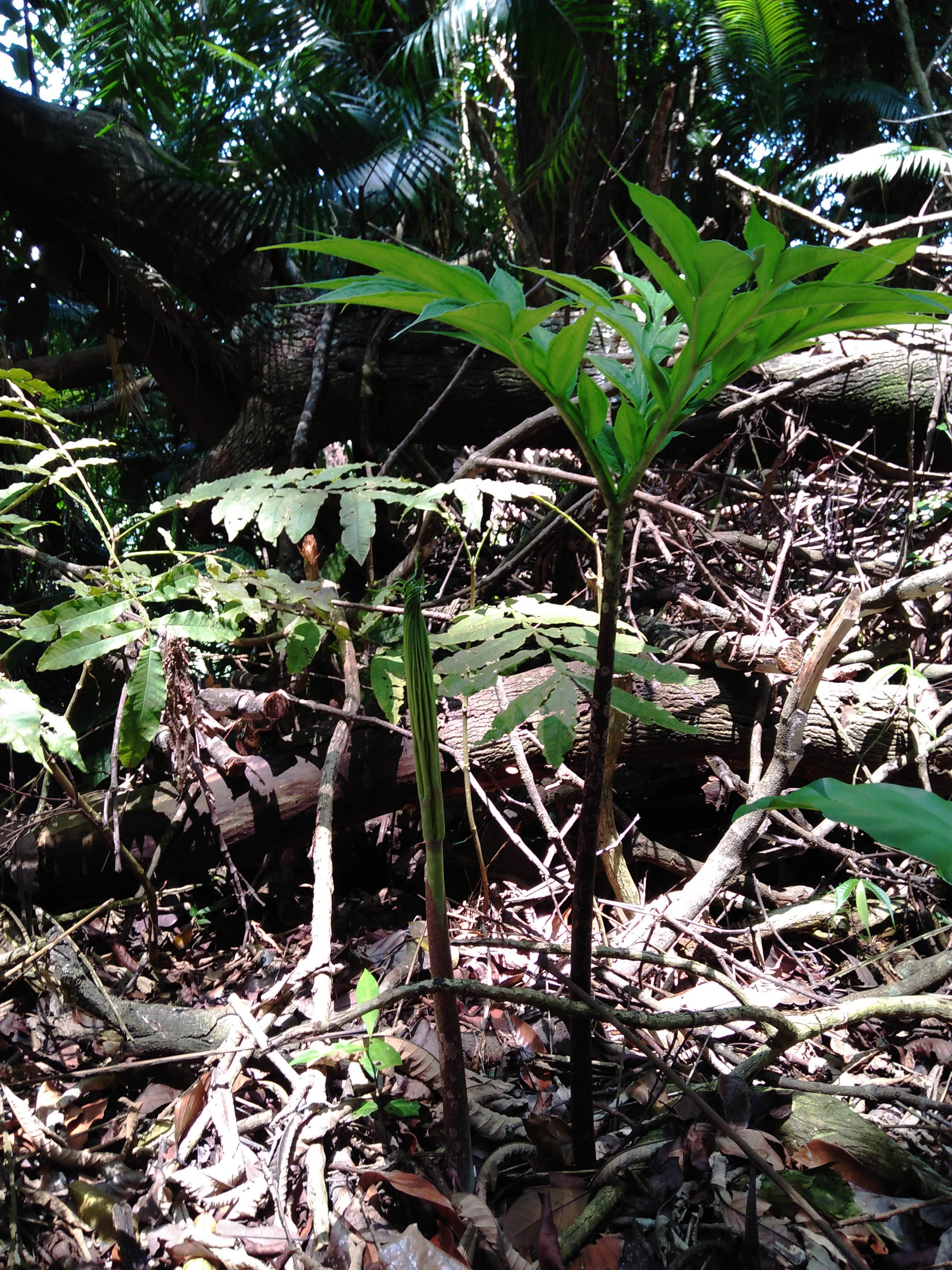
Amorphophallus titanum is one of the many plant species in the Park

The district holds the Sibolangit Nature Tourism Park (Taman Wisata Alam Sibolangit), home of a natural forest with little human disruption. The park attracts tourism, and has many young people acting as tour guides, participating in activities such as tree planting and religious activities. The region around the park benefits economically from agroforestry activities, with mangosteen, Durio crassipes and garcinia being amongst the top contributors to household income.

== Notable people ==
- Likas Tarigan
