= Flying Tiger Line Flight 066 =

1989 aviation accident in Malaysia

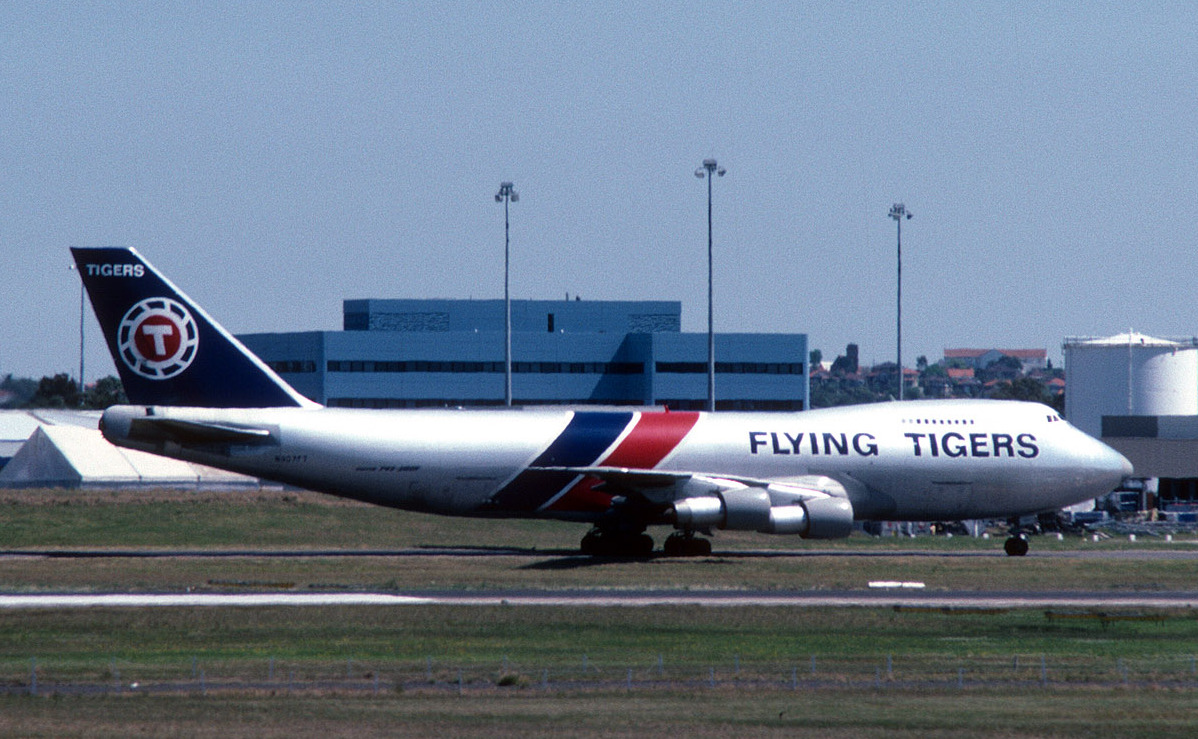
- N807FT, the aircraft involved in the accident, pictured in 1988

Accident
- Date: 19 February 1989
- Summary: Controlled flight into terrain due to pilot error
- Site: Puchong, 12 km (7.5 mi; 6.5 nmi) from Kuala Lumpur International Airport; 3.0153°N 101.6389°E

Aircraft
- Aircraft type: Boeing 747-249F-SCD
- Aircraft name: Thomas Haywood
- Operator: Flying Tiger Line
- IATA flight No.: FT066
- ICAO flight No.: FTL066
- Call sign: TIGER 66
- Registration: N807FT
- Flight origin: Singapore Changi Airport, Changi, Singapore
- Stopover: Kuala Lumpur International Airport, Subang, Selangor, Malaysia
- Destination: Kai Tak Airport, Kowloon, British Hong Kong
- Occupants: 4
- Passengers: 1
- Crew: 3
- Fatalities: 4
- Survivors: 0

Flying Tiger Line Flight 066 was a scheduled international cargo flight from Changi Airport to Kai Tak Airport via a stopover at Kuala Lumpur International Airport. On 19 February 1989, the FedEx-owned Boeing 747-249F-SCD crashed while on its final approach. The aircraft impacted a hillside 437 ft (133 m) above sea level and 12 km (7.5 mi; 6.5 nmi) from Kuala Lumpur, resulting in all four occupants being killed.

== Aircraft and crew ==
The aircraft, registered as N807FT, made its first flight on 1 November 1979, before being delivered new to Flying Tiger Line on 11 December 1979. Its manufacturer serial number was 21828 and its construction number was 408. At the time of the accident, it had flown over 9,000 flight cycles and 34,000 airframe hours.

The crew consisted of Captain Francis "Frank" Halpin (59), First Officer John "Jack" Robinson (54), and Flight Engineer Ronald Penton (70). Leonard Sulewski (53), an aircraft mechanic, was also on board.

== Accident ==
The aircraft was assigned a non-directional beacon (NDB) approach to Runway 33 at Sultan Abdul Aziz Shah Airport, Kuala Lumpur, after having flown 30 minutes from Singapore Changi Airport. In descent, the flight was cleared to "Kayell" with a Morse code of "KL" of which four separate points on the ground were commonly called by Malaysian ATC, albeit with different frequencies. Two separate radio beacons were identically coded "KL", as well as the VOR abbreviation (Kuala Lumpur shortened to "KL") and the airport was also sometimes referred to as "KL" by local ATC (instead of the full "Kuala Lumpur"). The crew was unsure to which point they were cleared, and the cockpit voice recorder (CVR) revealed that the crew argued about which radios should be set to which frequencies and which approach was actually going to be conducted. (Even in the last few moments of the flight, the captain referenced the ILS approach for runway 33, which was named as inoperable on the flight release and the ATIS; additionally the crew was told by ATC that the ILS approach was not available.)

Air traffic control (ATC) radioed to the flight, "Tiger 66, descend two four zero zero (about 2,400 ft (730 m)), cleared for NDB approach runway 33." Captain Halpin, who interpreted it as "descend to four zero zero" replied with, "Okay, four zero zero" (meaning 400 ft (120 m)) above sea level, which was 2,000 ft (610 m) too low). The CVR also revealed several communication errors made by the flight crew prior to this miscommunication and a general casual nature of the captain, who was the pilot-not-flying on this particular leg of the trip.

During the final approach, numerous clear warnings were given by the on-board ground proximity warning system, which were all ignored entirely by the crew, and the aircraft hit a hillside 437 ft (133 m) above sea level, killing all four crew on board—two pilots, a flight engineer, and an aircraft mechanic. The subsequent fire burned for two days.

== Causes ==
The first officer (FO) had complained that he did not have an approach plate in front of him and had not seen the approach.

Additionally, the FO, who was the pilot flying at the time, expressed concern about conducting the NDB approach and indicated a preference for the ILS for runway 15. The FO was not assertive, though, and no further action was taken. The captain dismissed his concern, saying he was familiar with the airport and the approaches.

A contributing factor to this accident was the non-ICAO phraseology used by Kuala Lumpur ATC and the captain of the aircraft. This breakdown of communication contributed to the crew misinterpreting the instructions given. This particular controlled-flight-into-terrain accident, however, ultimately resulted from a crew failure to adhere to the instrument approach procedure, poor crew resource management, and poor situational awareness.

== See also ==
- List of aviation accidents and incidents involving CFIT
- Korean Air Flight 801
