= Korean Air Flight 801 =

1997 aviation accident in Guam

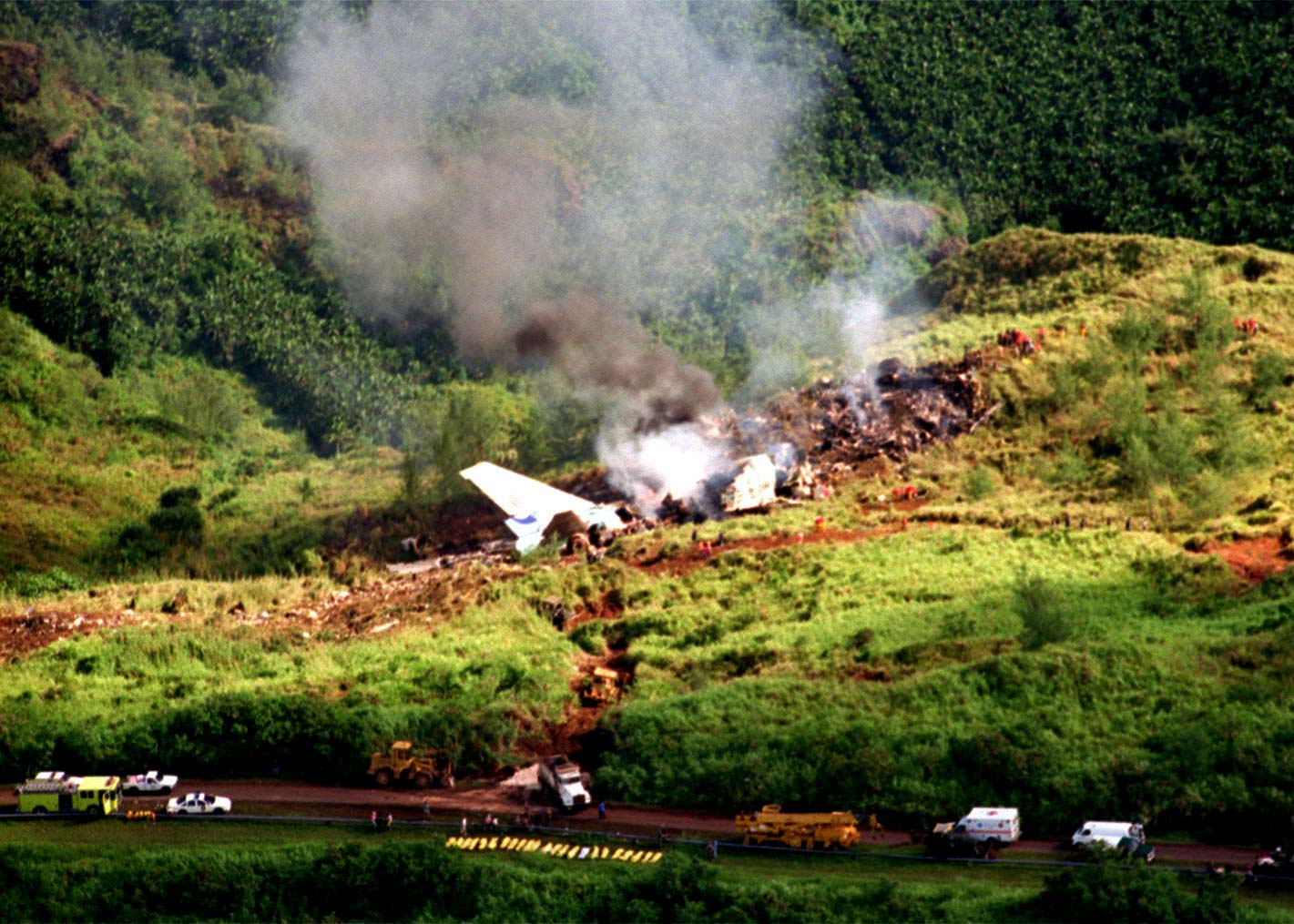
- Aerial view of the aircraft wreckage

Accident
- Date: August 6, 1997
- Summary: Controlled flight into terrain due to pilot error in bad weather
- Site: Bijia Peak, Asan-Maina, near Antonio B. Won Pat International Airport, Guam, United States; 13°27.35′N 144°43.92′E

Aircraft
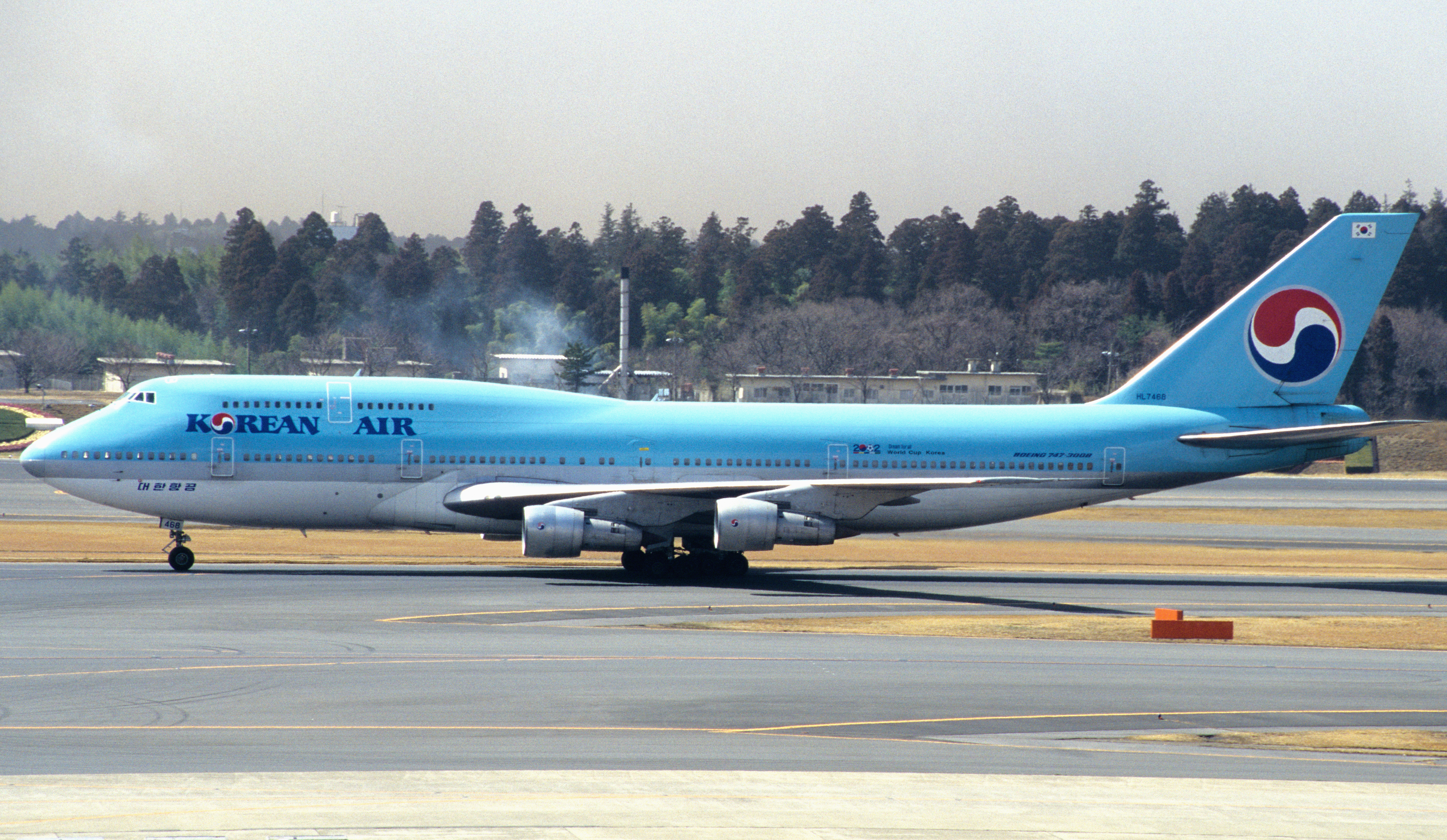
- HL7468, the aircraft involved in the accident
- Aircraft type: Boeing 747-3B5
- Operator: Korean Air
- IATA flight No.: KE801
- ICAO flight No.: KAL801
- Call sign: KOREAN AIR 801
- Registration: HL7468
- Flight origin: Gimpo International Airport, Seoul, South Korea
- Destination: Antonio B. Won Pat International Airport, Guam, United States
- Occupants: 254
- Passengers: 235
- Crew: 19
- Fatalities: 229 (Note: This figure includes a 229th fatality who died on October 10, more than 30 days after the accident. The NTSB, however, treated this fatality as a survivor with "serious" injuries in accordance with 49 CFR 830.2.)
- Injuries: 25
- Survivors: 25

Korean Air Flight 801 was a scheduled international passenger flight operated by Korean Air, from Gimpo International Airport, Seoul to Antonio B. Won Pat International Airport, Guam. On August 6, 1997, the Boeing 747-300 operating the flight crashed on Bijia Peak, south of Nimitz Hill, in Asan-Maina, Guam, while on approach to the destination airport, killing 229 of the 254 people aboard, making it the deadliest aviation accident to occur in American dependent territory, and the fourth-deadliest aviation accident on American soil overall. (Note: Only surpassed by the crashes of TWA Flight 800, American Airlines Flight 587 and American Airlines Flight 191. The plane crashes of the September 11 attacks were acts of terrorism, not accidents.)

The National Transportation Safety Board cites poor communication between the flight crew as the probable cause of this accident, along with the captain's poor decision-making on the non-precision approach.

== Background ==
=== Aircraft ===
The aircraft involved in the accident, manufactured in 1984, was a Boeing 747-3B5, registered as HL7468, which was delivered to Korean Air on December 12, 1984. The plane was equipped with four Pratt & Whitney JT9D-7R4G2 engines.

=== Crew ===
The flight was under the command of 42-year-old Captain Park Yong-chul. The captain had close to 9,000 hours of flight time, including 3,192 on the Boeing 747, and had recently received a flight safety award for successfully landing a 747 that had suffered an engine failure at low altitude. Park was originally scheduled to fly to Dubai, United Arab Emirates, but since he had not received enough required rest for the Dubai trip, he was reassigned to Flight 801. The first officer was 40-year-old Song Kyung-ho, who had more than 4,000 hours flying experience, with 1,560 of them on the Boeing 747. The flight engineer was 57-year-old Nam Suk-hoon, a veteran pilot with more than 13,000 flight hours, 1,573 of which were on the Boeing 747.

== Accident ==
NTSB animation of Flight 801's descent

Another NTSB animation of Flight 801's descent, showing the aircraft's distance from the runway and topography in the area

ATC audio after KAL 801 failed to land at the airport

In 1997, the route was normally flown by an Airbus A300, but since Korean Air was charged with transporting Chamorro athletes to the South Pacific Mini Games in American Samoa, the airline substituted the larger 747-300 to fly the route that night.

Flight 801 departed from Seoul-Kimpo International Airport (now Gimpo International Airport) at 8:53 pm (9:53 pm Guam time) on August 5. It carried three flight crew members (the two pilots and the flight engineer), 14 flight attendants, and 237 passengers from four countries, 254 people in total. In the summer, Guam is a popular tourist destination among South Koreans, and many passengers were travelling with family. There were many children on the flight; Korean media stated the presence of numerous children with their families, while the NTSB reported the presence of only three children between the ages of 2 and 12 and three 24 months old or younger. Six of the passengers were Korean Air flight attendants, who were deadheading.

The flight experienced some turbulence but was uneventful until shortly after 1:00 am on August 6, as the jet was preparing to land. It was raining heavily in Guam, so visibility was considerably reduced, and the crew attempted an instrument landing. The glideslope Instrument Landing System (ILS) for runway 6L was out of service, but Captain Park mistakenly believed it was in service, and at 1:35 am, he managed to pick up a signal that was later identified to be from an irrelevant electronic device on the ground. First officer Song and flight engineer Nam both noticed that the aircraft was descending very steeply, and remarked several times that the airport "is not in sight." Despite protests from Nam that the detected signal was not the glide-slope indicator, Park continued the approach, and at 1:42 am, the aircraft crashed into Bijia Peak just short of a VHF omnidirectional range navigation beacon about 3 nmi (3.5 mi; 5.6 km) short of the runway, at an altitude of 660 ft (200 m).

Of the 254 people on board, 229 died as a result of the crash. One survivor, 36-year-old Hyun Seong Hong (also spelled Hong Hyun Sung), of the United States, occupied seat 3B in first class, and said that the crash occurred so quickly that the passengers "had no time to scream" and likened the crash to "a scene from a film."

== Rescue ==
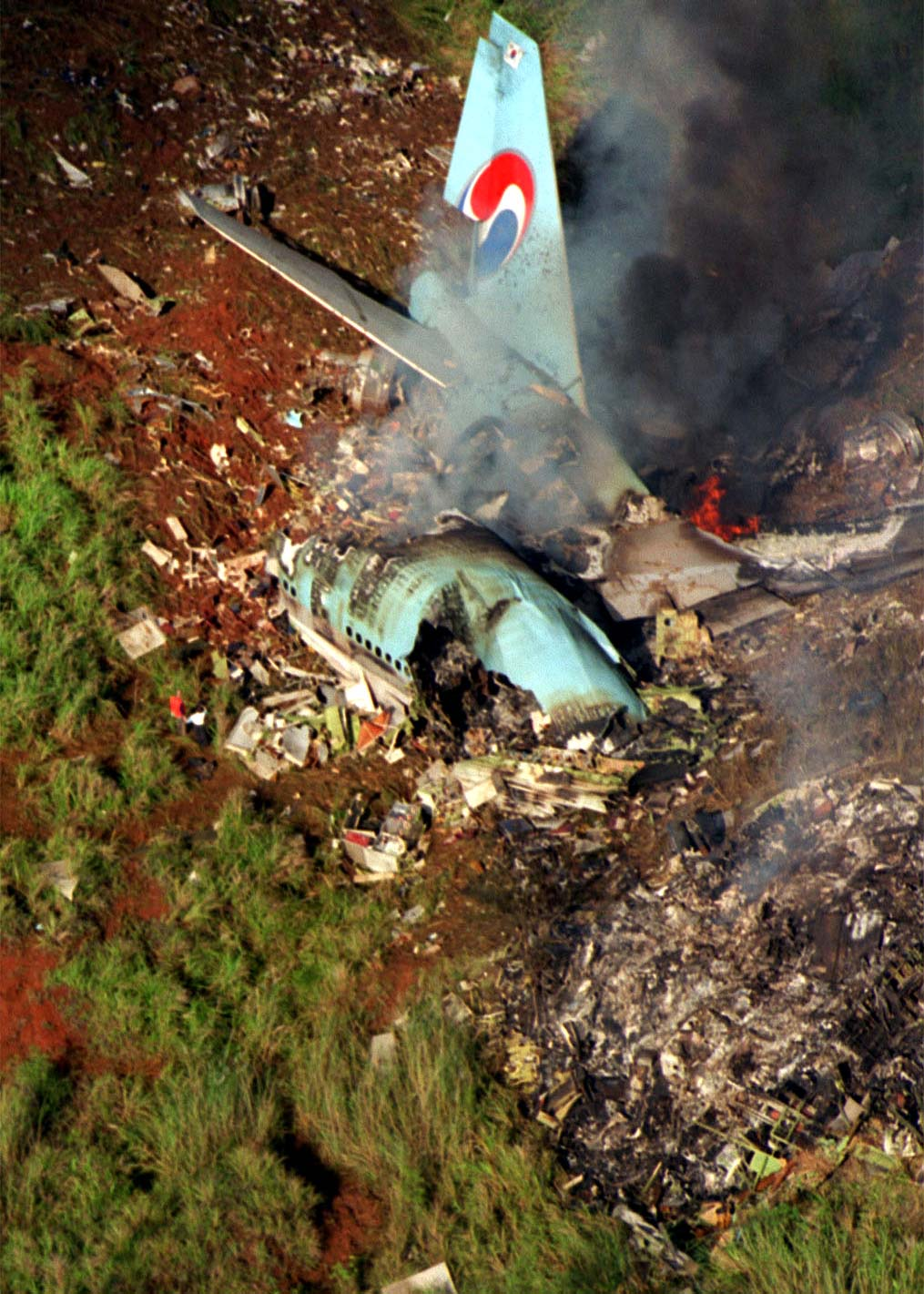
An aerial view of the crash site

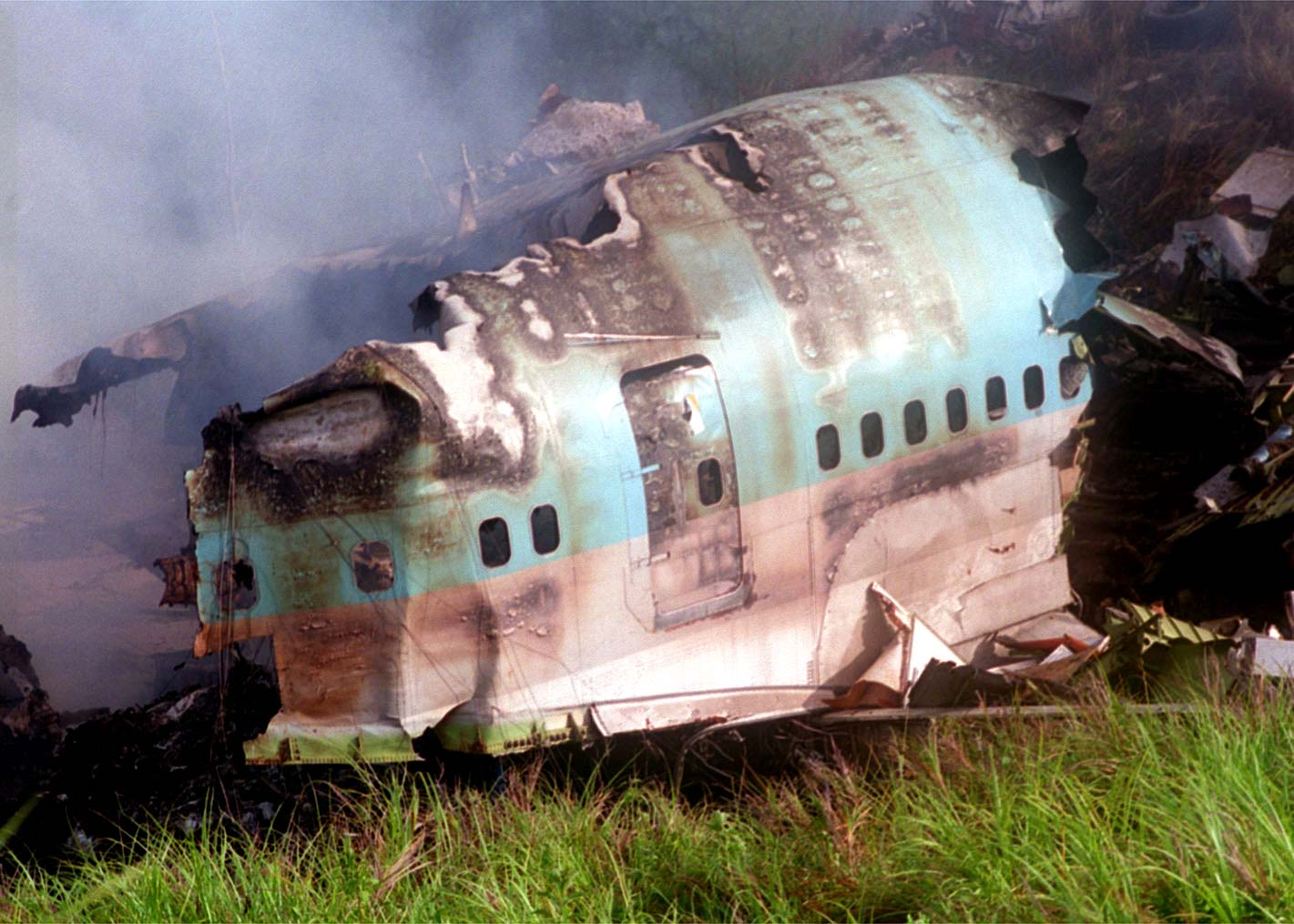
Wreckage of HL7468 burns at the Sasa Valley crash site

The rescue effort was hampered by the weather, terrain, and other problems. Emergency vehicles could not approach because a fuel pipeline, destroyed by the crash, blocked the narrow road. United States Navy Seabees of NMCB-133 and NMCB-40 were some of the first on the scene and used their earth-moving equipment to clear roadways and timber from the crash-site approach. The Seabees used backhoes to crack open the still-burning plane to rescue survivors and erected mortuary tents for first responders. Confusion arose over the administration of the effort; the crash occurred on land owned by the United States Navy, but civil authorities initially claimed authority. The hull had disintegrated, and jet fuel in the wing tanks had sparked a fire that was still burning eight hours after impact.

=== Rika Matsuda ===
Governor Carl Gutierrez found 11-year-old Rika Matsuda, from Japan, who had boarded the flight with her mother, 44-year-old Shigeko. They were heading to Guam on vacation. Rika Matsuda described to interpreters what happened to her mother and her. Luggage piled on the girl and her mother as the crash occurred; Rika Matsuda said her mother, unable to free herself, asked her to leave. Shigeko died in the fire. After escaping from the aircraft, Rika discovered a surviving flight attendant, Lee Yong Ho. They stayed together until Gutierrez discovered them. Rika Matsuda, treated at Guam Memorial Hospital in Tamuning, was released on August 7, 1997, and was reunited with her father, Tatsuo Matsuda. The two were then escorted to the Governor House, where they were the guests of Gutierrez and the First Lady of Guam, Geri Gutierrez, for several days; afterward, Rika and Tatsuo Matsuda flew to Japan.

== Investigation and probable cause ==
The U.S. National Transportation Safety Board (NTSB) investigated the accident, as it occurred in U.S. territory.

A special weather observation made at 01:32, 10 minutes before the impact, reported:

Wind 090° at 6 knots; visibility—7 miles; present weather—shower vicinity; sky condition—scattered 1,600 feet, broken 2,500 feet, overcast 5,000 feet [above ground level]; temperature—27 °C; dew point—25 °C; altimeter setting 29.85 inches Hg; remarks—showers vicinity northwest-northeast.

Another special weather observation made at 01:47, five minutes after the impact, reported:

Wind variable at 4 knots; visibility—5 miles; present weather—light rain shower; sky condition—few 1,500 feet, scattered 2,500 feet, overcast 4,000 feet; temperature—26 °C; dew point—24 °C; altimeter 29.85 inches Hg.

The crew had been using an outdated aeronautical chart that was missing a 724 ft (221 m) obstruction symbol depicted at the NIMITZ VOR, and that map stated the minimum safe altitude while crossing the NIMITZ VOR for a landing aircraft was 1,300 ft (400 m) as opposed to the updated altitude of 1,440 ft (440 m). Flight 801 crashed near the NIMITZ VOR, which is situated on Bijia Peak at an altitude of 680 ft (210 m) at 1:42 am, when it descended below the minimum safe altitude of 1440 ft during its landing approach. The report also identified that the captain may have mistakenly believed that the airplane was closer to the airport than it was, and confusion may have existed about the location of the distance measuring equipment (DME) in relation to the airport, with the crew anticipating the VOR/DME to be located at the airport. The DME was sited at the NIMITZ VOR some 3.3 nmi (3.8 mi; 6.1 km) from the airport and such a configuration had not been part of Korean Air's simulator training, the crew's training for such non-precision approaches having been carried out in scenarios where the DME was located at the airport. Nevertheless, the correct DME distances were shown on the approach chart.

The NTSB was critical of the flight crew's monitoring of the approach, and even more critical of why the first officer and flight engineer did not challenge the captain for his errors. Even before the accident, Korean Air's crew resource management program was already attempting to promote a free atmosphere between the flight crew, requiring the first officer and flight engineer to challenge the captain if they felt concerned. The flight crew only began to challenge the captain six seconds before impact, though, when the first officer urged the captain to make a missed approach. According to the cockpit voice recorder, the flight crew suggested to the captain that he had made a mistake, but did not explicitly warn him. The flight crew had the opportunity to be more aggressive in its challenge and the first officer even had the opportunity to take over control of the aircraft and execute a missed approach himself, which would have prevented the accident, but he did not do this. Despite examining Korean Air's safety culture and previous incidents, the NTSB was unable to determine the exact reasons why the flight crew failed to challenge the captain, but at the same time noted that "problems associated with subordinate officers challenging a captain are well known".

Air traffic control (ATC) also played a role in the accident. The center/approach controller, 39-year-old Kurt James Mayo, did not adhere to standard ATC procedures and failed to monitor the aircraft during its descent. Specifically, he did not monitor the flight after the crew switched to the tower frequency as required, did not give a position advisory to the flight crew when clearing them for the approach (which would have advised them to cross-check their position on the radar with that of other flight instruments), and did not monitor the flight on the terminal radar display, which showed the terrain in the area because radar service had been terminated at the time. The NTSB said that had Mayo followed the procedures, the accident could have been prevented or at least reduced in severity. The tower controller, Marty Irvin Theobald (also 39), was also criticized for not alerting the crew, as Mayo had been unaware of the aircraft's low altitude, and did not provide an alert to him.

The NTSB also criticized the emergency responders for their delayed rescue operation, citing that most of the factors that delayed the response were preventable. These factors included ATC's initial unawareness of the accident, a brake failure on a fire truck, and a delayed notification of the fire department. The NTSB also concluded that at least one person who survived the initial crash could have recovered had the response not been delayed.

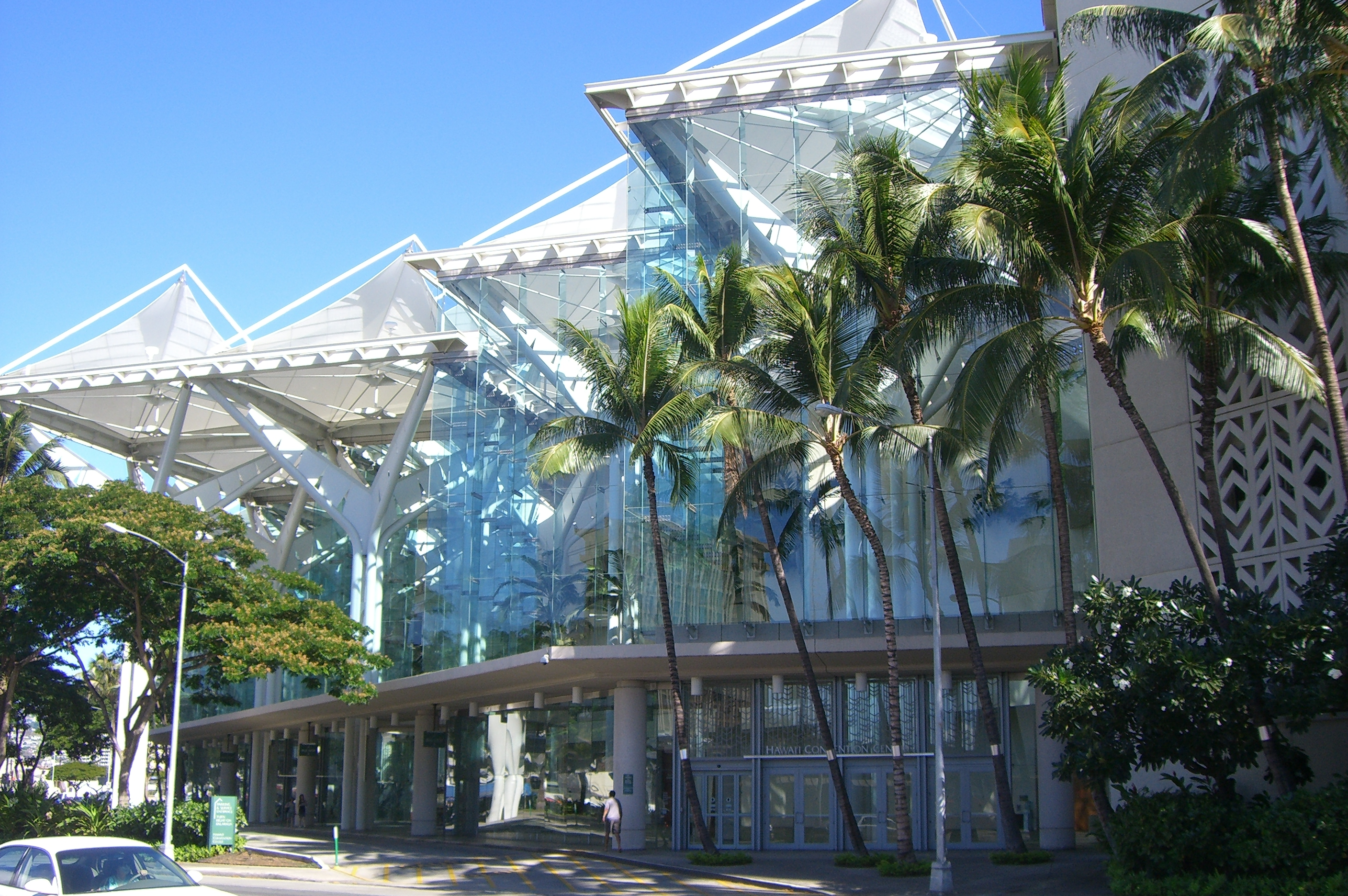
The Hawaii Convention Center is where the NTSB held its public hearings for Flight 801.

The NTSB presented its findings on March 24, 25, and 26, 1998, at the Hawaii Convention Center in Honolulu.

The section of the report entitled "Probable Cause" concluded:

The National Transportation Safety Board determines that the probable cause of this accident was the captain's failure to adequately brief and execute the non-precision approach and the first officer's and flight engineer's failure to effectively monitor and cross-check the captain's execution of the approach. Contributing to these failures were the captain's fatigue and Korean Air's inadequate flight crew training. Contributing to the accident was the Federal Aviation Administration's intentional inhibition of the minimum safe altitude warning system at Guam and the agency's failure to adequately manage the system.

The investigation report stated that a contributing factor was that the ATC Minimum Safe Altitude Warning (MSAW) system at Antonio B. Won Pat International Airport had been deliberately modified to limit spurious alarms and could not detect an approaching aircraft that was below minimum safe altitude. The probable cause of the accident was the captain's poor execution of the non-precision approach, the captain's fatigue, poor communication between the flight crew, and Korean Air's lack of flight crew training.

== Passengers ==
Locations of the survivors

=== Deaths and injuries ===
Of the 254 people on board, 223 people—209 passengers and 14 crew members (all 3 flight crew, and 11 cabin crew)— died at the scene.

Of the 31 occupants found alive by rescue crews, 2 died en route to the hospital and a further 3 in hospital. Among the survivors, 16 received burn injuries. The 26 survivors were initially treated at Guam Memorial Hospital in Tamuning or at Naval Hospital Guam in Agana Heights. Four were subsequently transferred to the U.S. Army Burn Center in San Antonio, Texas and eight to University Hospital in Seoul. On October 10 of that year, one passenger died from injuries suffered in the crash, bringing the number of fatalities to 229 and the number of survivors to 25.

Twenty-two passengers and three flight attendants survived the crash with serious injuries.

=== Notable passengers ===
Shin Ki-ha, a four-term South Korean parliamentarian and former leader of the National Congress for New Politics, traveled with his wife and around 20 party members. Shin and his wife were both killed. A married couple of well-known voice actors, Jeong Gyeong-ae and Jang Se-jun, died in the crash along with their two sons. Hong Seong-hyeon, director of the Korean Broadcasting System's news department, died in the crash with two of his children, while his wife and younger daughter survived.

=== Identification and repatriation of bodies ===
On August 13, 1997, twelve sets of remains were brought to Guam's airport to be prepared to be repatriated to Seoul. Clifford Guzman, a governor's aide, said that two of the twelve were taken back to the morgue. Of the ten, one was misidentified and had to be switched before takeoff. The ten bodies transported to Seoul were those of seven passengers and three female flight attendants. On the same date, an NTSB family-affairs official named Matthew Furman said that in total, by that date, 46 bodies had been identified. When identification finished in January 1998, only 175 bodies were identified, while 53 were not. Among them, 37 bodies had been completely carbonised and it was impossible to carry out DNA analysis on another 16.

== Aftermath ==
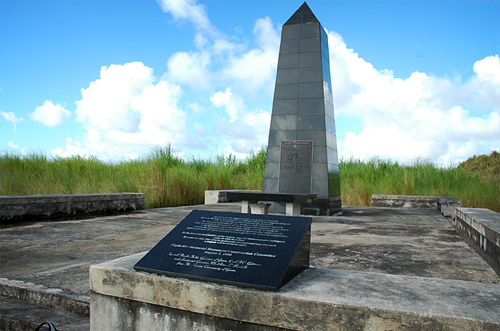
Korean Air Flight 801 Memorial in Asan-Maina, Guam

After the crash occurred, the airline provided several flights for around 300 relatives so that they could go to the crash site.

On August 13, 1997, 50 protesters staged a sit-in at Guam Airport, saying that the recovery of the dead was taking too long; they sat on blankets and sheets of paper at the Korean Air counter.

== Legacy ==
On August 6, 1998, the first anniversary of the crash, a black marble obelisk was unveiled on the crash site as a memorial to the victims.

After the accident, Korean Air services to Guam were suspended for more than four years, leading to fewer tourists visiting Guam and further losses for Korean Air. When Seoul-Guam services resumed in December 2001, the flight number was changed to 805.

In 2000, a lawsuit was settled in the amount of US$70 million on behalf of 54 families against the airline.

New Zealander Barry Small, a helicopter pilot and a survivor of the accident, lobbied for safer storage of duty-free alcohol and redesigns of crossbars on airline seats; he said that the storage of duty-free alcohol on Flight 801 contributed to the spreading of the fire and the crossbars injured passengers so that they could not escape from the aircraft. (Small himself was injured when he broke his leg on one of the crossbars during the crash, but was still able to escape the aircraft.)

The government of Guam moved its web page covering the Korean Air crash after the Spamcop program alerted the government that advance fee fraud spam from Nigeria used the website link as a part of the scam. Scam e-mails used names of passengers, such as Sean Burke, as part of the fraud.

Following the Korean Air 801 crash, the NTSB was made aware that foreign carriers flying in and out of the US were not covered by the Aviation Disaster Family Assistance Act of 1996 and Korean Air did not have a plan to deal with the situation. As a result, the US Congress passed the Foreign Air Carrier Family Support Act of 1997 to require those carriers to file family-assistance plans and fulfill the same family-support requirements as domestic airlines.

== In popular culture ==
- Malcolm Gladwell discusses the crash in the context of cultural effects on power structures in his book Outliers.
- The Discovery Channel Canada / National Geographic TV series Mayday (also called Air Crash Investigation or Air Emergency) dramatized the accident in a 2007 episode titled "Final Approach," although it was also titled "Missed Approach" for the episode on Air Disasters, and "Blind Landing" for the UK.
- It is featured in season two, episode one, of the TV show Why Planes Crash, in an episode called "Crisis in the Sky".

== See also ==
- List of aviation accidents and incidents involving CFIT
- Impact of culture on aviation safety

== Additional sources ==
- National Transportation Safety Board
- Korean Air Flight 801 Final Accident Report
- Government of Guam:, photographs, passenger manifest, scanned news articles, and related links
- PBS Newshour with Jim Lehrer: "Tragedy on Guam," August 6, 1997
- "List of passengers aboard Korean Air Flight 801" (also lists crew members) CNN
- "Airline's List Of Survivors". The New York Times. August 7, 1997.
- Pollack, Andrew (August 8, 1997). "Pilot Error Is Suspected in Crash on Guam". The New York Times.
- Guam rescuers: 27 survivors, no more expected, CNN (Archive)
- Pilot error focus in Guam crash, CNN
- Photos used to identify Guam crash victims, CNN (Archive)
- Pollack, Andrew (August 7, 1997). "29 Survive the Guam Crash, but Hope for Others Ends". The New York Times.
- Rescuers search smoldering jet debris in Guam, CNN (Archive)
- Tragedy on Guam, PBS
