= Minimum safe altitude warning =

Air traffic control warning system

Minimum safe altitude warning (MSAW) is an automated warning system for air traffic controllers (ATCO). It is a ground-based safety net intended to warn the controller about increased risk of controlled flight into terrain accidents by generating, in a timely manner, an alert of aircraft proximity to terrain or obstacles.

== Description ==
International Civil Aviation Organization Doc 4444 requires that radar systems should provide for the display of safety-related alerts including the presentation of minimum safe altitude warning. The radar equipment predicts an aircraft’s position in 2 minutes based on present path of flight, and the controller issues a safety alert if the projected path encounters terrain or an obstruction. An unusually rapid descent rate on a non-precision approach can trigger such an alert.

It is worth mentioning that ICAO Doc 4444 does not provide a definition of the term MSAW. Instead the term MSAW is ambiguously used in ATC community to identify such warnings as well as for data processing systems providing the alert function.
