= List of aviation accidents and incidents involving CFIT =

This is a list of plane crashes that have occurred because of controlled flight into terrain (CFIT), an accident in which an airworthy aircraft, under pilot control, is unintentionally flown into the ground, a mountain, a body of water or an obstacle.

== Airblue Flight 202 ==
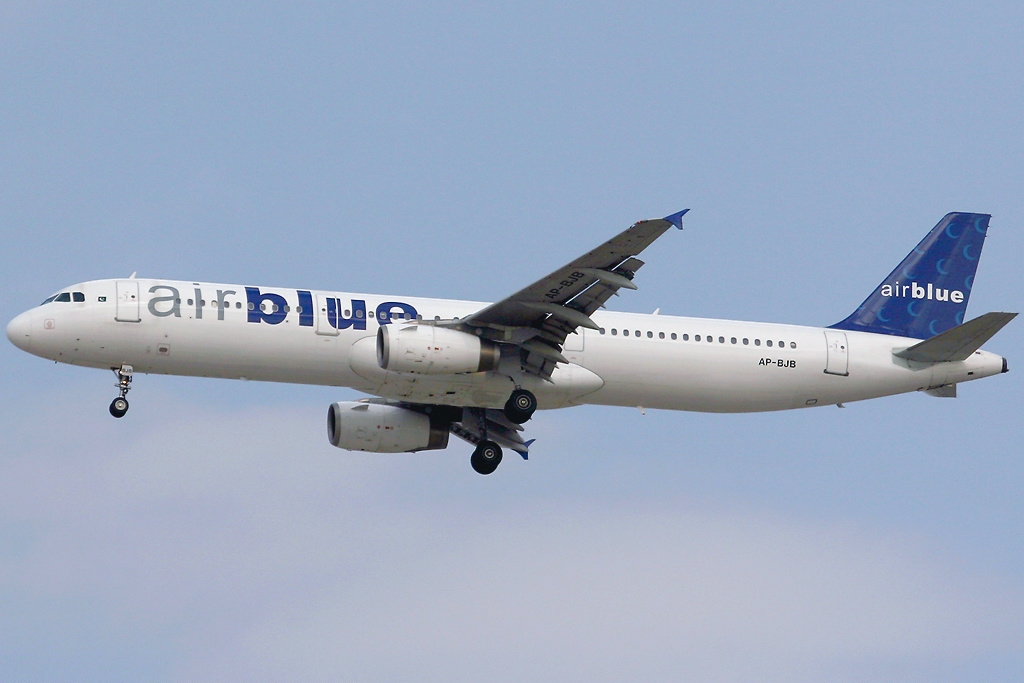
AP-BJB, the aircraft involved in the accident in 2007

On 28 July 2010, Airblue Flight 202, an Airbus A321-231 registered as AP-BJB, crashed in the Margalla Hills, Islamabad, Pakistan. The weather was poor with low visibility. During a non-standard self-created approach below the minimum descent altitude, the aircraft crashed into the ground after the captain ignored 21 cockpit warnings to pull-up. There were no survivors. The captain Pervez Iqbal Chaudry, was one of Airblue's most senior pilots with more than 35 years experience. The accident was the first fatal accident involving the A321, and the deadliest plane crash in Pakistan.

== 2012 Mount Salak Sukhoi Superjet crash ==
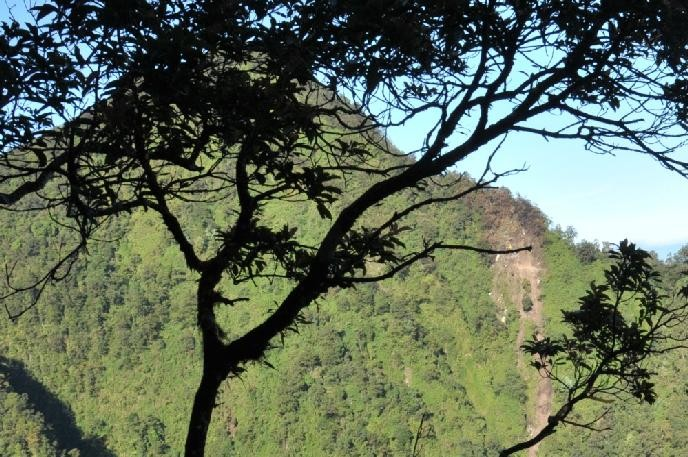
The aftermath of the crash.

On May 9, 2012, a Sukhoi Superjet 100 airliner on a demonstration tour in Indonesia crashed into Mount Salak, in the province of West Java. All 37 passengers and 8 crew on board were killed. The plane had taken off minutes before from Jakarta's Halim Airport on a promotional flight for the recently launched jet, and was carrying Sukhoi personnel and representatives of various local airlines. While flying through clouds, the aircraft's ground proximity warning system sounded in the cockpit. The pilots disregarded it, believing it to be an error, and seconds later, the aircraft crashed into the side of Mount Salak at an altitude of 6,270 feet (1,910 m).

The subsequent investigation concluded that the flight crew was unaware of the presence of high ground in the area and ignored warnings from the terrain warning system, incorrectly concluding the warnings to a system malfunction due to thick clouds blocking their outside view. In the minutes leading to the accident, the crew, including the captain, were found to have been engaged in conversation with prospective customers present in the cockpit.

== Korean Air Flight 801 ==
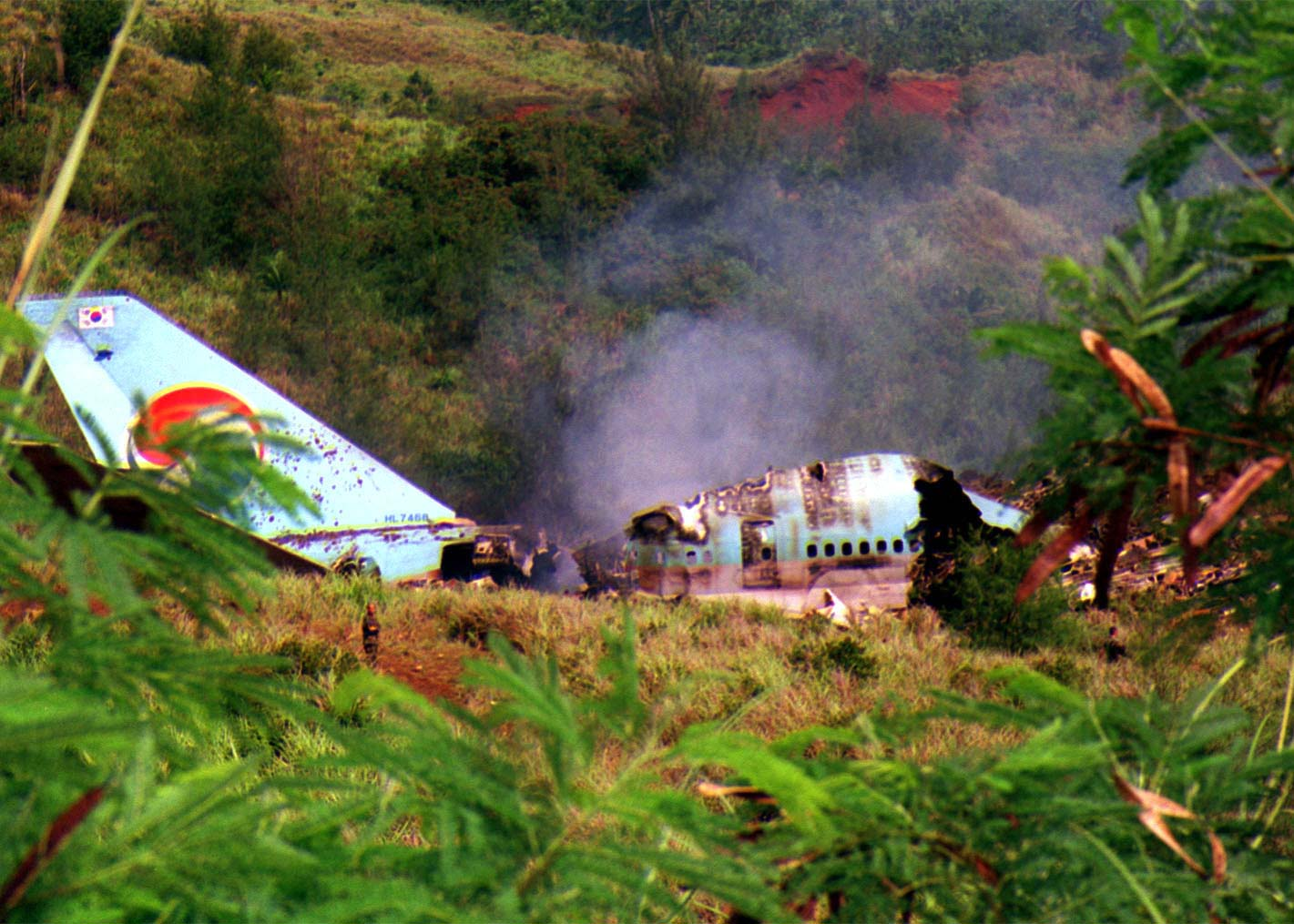
Side view of the crash site

Korean Air Flight 801 (KE801, KAL801) was a scheduled international passenger flight operated by Korean Air. The flight crashed on August 6, 1997, on approach to Antonio B. Won Pat International Airport, in the United States territory of Guam, killing 229 (Note: This figure does not include a 229th fatality that occurred on October 10, more than 30 days after the accident.) of the 254 people aboard. The aircraft crashed on Nimitz Hill in Asan-Maina, Guam, while on approach to the airport. The National Transportation Safety Board cited poor communication between the flight crew as probable cause for the crash, along with the captain's poor decision-making on the non-precision approach.

== American Airlines Flight 965 ==
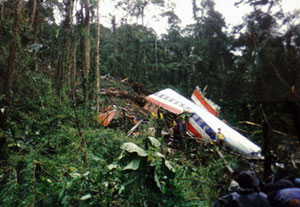
View of one of the only intact part of the fuselage

American Airlines Flight 965 was a regularly scheduled flight from Miami International Airport in Miami, Florida, to Alfonso Bonilla Aragón International Airport in Cali, Colombia. On December 20, 1995, the Boeing 757-200 flying this route crashed into a mountain in Buga, Colombia, killing 151 out of the 155 passengers and all 8 crew members.

The Colombian Special Administrative Unit of Civil Aeronautics investigated the accident and determined it was caused by navigational errors by the flight crew.

The crash was the first US-owned 757 accident and is currently the deadliest aviation accident to occur in Colombia.

== Flying Tiger Line Flight 066 ==
Flying Tiger Line Flight 066 was a scheduled international cargo flight from Singapore Changi Airport, in Changi, Singapore, to Hong Kong's Kai Tak Airport in the Kowloon Peninsula with a stopover at Kuala Lumpur International Airport (now Sultan Abdul Aziz Shah Airport), in Subang, Selangor, near Kuala Lumpur, Malaysia. On February 19, 1989, the FedEx-owned Boeing 747-249F-SCD crashed while on its final approach to Kuala Lumpur. The aircraft impacted a hillside 437 feet (133 m) above sea level and 7.5 miles (12 km) from the airport, resulting in all four crew members being killed.

== Eastern Air Lines Flight 980 ==
Eastern Air Lines Flight 980 was a scheduled international flight from Asunción, Paraguay, to Miami, Florida, United States. On January 1, 1985, while descending towards La Paz, Bolivia, for a scheduled stopover, the Boeing 727 jetliner struck Mount Illimani at an altitude of 19,600 feet (6,000 m), killing all 29 people on board.

The wreckage was scattered over a large area of a glacier covered with snow. Over the decades, several search expeditions have been able to recover only a small amount of debris, and searches for the flight recorders have been unsuccessful. The accident remains the highest-altitude controlled flight into terrain in commercial aviation history. The exact cause of the accident has never been determined.

== Air New Zealand Flight 901 ==
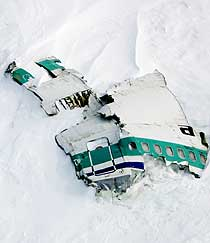
One of the many parts of the wreckage still at the crash site in Antarctica

Air New Zealand Flight 901 (TE-901) (Note: At the time of the crash, Air New Zealand had two IATA codes, TE for international flights (a relic from Air New Zealand's predecessor, Tasman Empire Airways Limited (TEAL)) and NZ for domestic flights (acquired from the merger with the National Airways Corporation in April 1978). Despite being domestic flights from an immigration point-of-view, the Antarctic flights used the TE code for logistical reasons.) was a scheduled Air New Zealand Antarctic sightseeing flight that operated between 1977 and 1979. The flight would leave Auckland Airport in the morning and spend a few hours flying over the Antarctic continent, before returning to Auckland in the evening via Christchurch. On November 28, 1979, the fourteenth flight of TE-901, a McDonnell Douglas DC-10-30, registration ZK-NZP, flew into Mount Erebus on Ross Island, Antarctica, killing all 237 passengers and 20 crew on board. The accident became known as the Mount Erebus disaster.

The initial investigation concluded the accident was caused by pilot error, but public outcry led to the establishment of a Royal Commission of Inquiry into the crash. The commission, presided over by Justice Peter Mahon QC, concluded that the accident was caused by a correction made to the coordinates of the flight path the night before the disaster, coupled with a failure to inform the flight crew of the change, with the result that the aircraft, instead of being directed by computer down McMurdo Sound (as the crew had been led to believe), was instead re-routed to a path toward Mount Erebus. Justice Mahon's report accused Air New Zealand of presenting "an orchestrated litany of lies" and this led to changes in senior management at the airline.

The accident is New Zealand's deadliest peacetime disaster, as well as the deadliest accident in the history of Air New Zealand.

== Eastern Air Lines Flight 401 ==
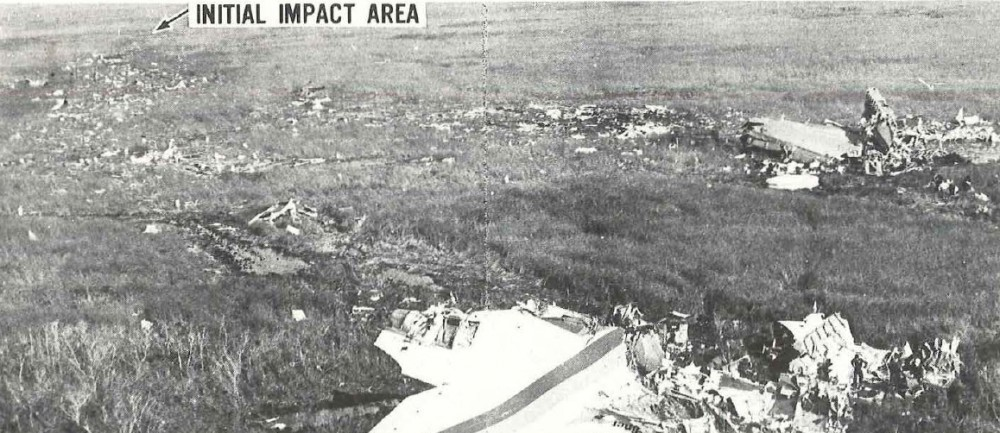
Overview of the wreckage

Eastern Air Lines Flight 401 was a scheduled flight from New York JFK to Miami. Shortly before midnight on December 29, 1972, the Lockheed L-1011 TriStar crashed into the Florida Everglades, causing 101 fatalities. The pilots and the flight engineer, 2 of 10 flight attendants, and 96 of 163 passengers died; 75 passengers and crew survived.

The crash occurred while the entire cockpit crew was preoccupied with a burnt-out landing gear indicator light. They failed to notice that the autopilot had inadvertently been disconnected, and as a result, the aircraft gradually lost altitude and crashed. This was the first fatal crash of a wide-body aircraft. It was also the first hull loss and first fatal crash of a Lockheed L-1011 TriStar.

== Winter Hill air disaster ==
The Winter Hill air disaster occurred on February 27, 1958, when the Silver City Airways Bristol 170 Freighter G-AICS, operated by Manx Airlines on a charter flight from the Isle of Man to Manchester, England, crashed during heavy snow into Winter Hill (also known as Rivington Moor), 5 miles (8.0 km) southeast of Chorley. Thirty-five people died and all seven survivors were injured; the cause was determined to be navigational errors.

== 1947 BSAA Avro Lancastrian Star Dust accident ==
On August 2, 1947, Star Dust, a British South American Airways Avro Lancastrian airliner operating as flight CS59 from Buenos Aires, Argentina, to Santiago, Chile, crashed into Mount Tupungato, in the Argentine Andes. An extensive search operation failed to locate the wreckage, despite covering the area of the crash site, and the fate of the aircraft and its occupants remained unknown for over 50 years, giving rise to various conspiracy theories about its disappearance.

In the late 1990s, pieces of wreckage from the missing aircraft began to emerge from the glacial ice. Now, the crew is believed to have become confused as to their exact location while flying at high altitudes through the (then poorly understood) jet stream. Mistakenly believing they had already cleared the mountain tops, they started their descent when they were, in fact, still behind cloud-covered peaks, and Star Dust crashed into Mount Tupungato, killing all 11 passengers and crew aboard and burying itself in snow and ice.

== Thai Airways International Flight 311 ==
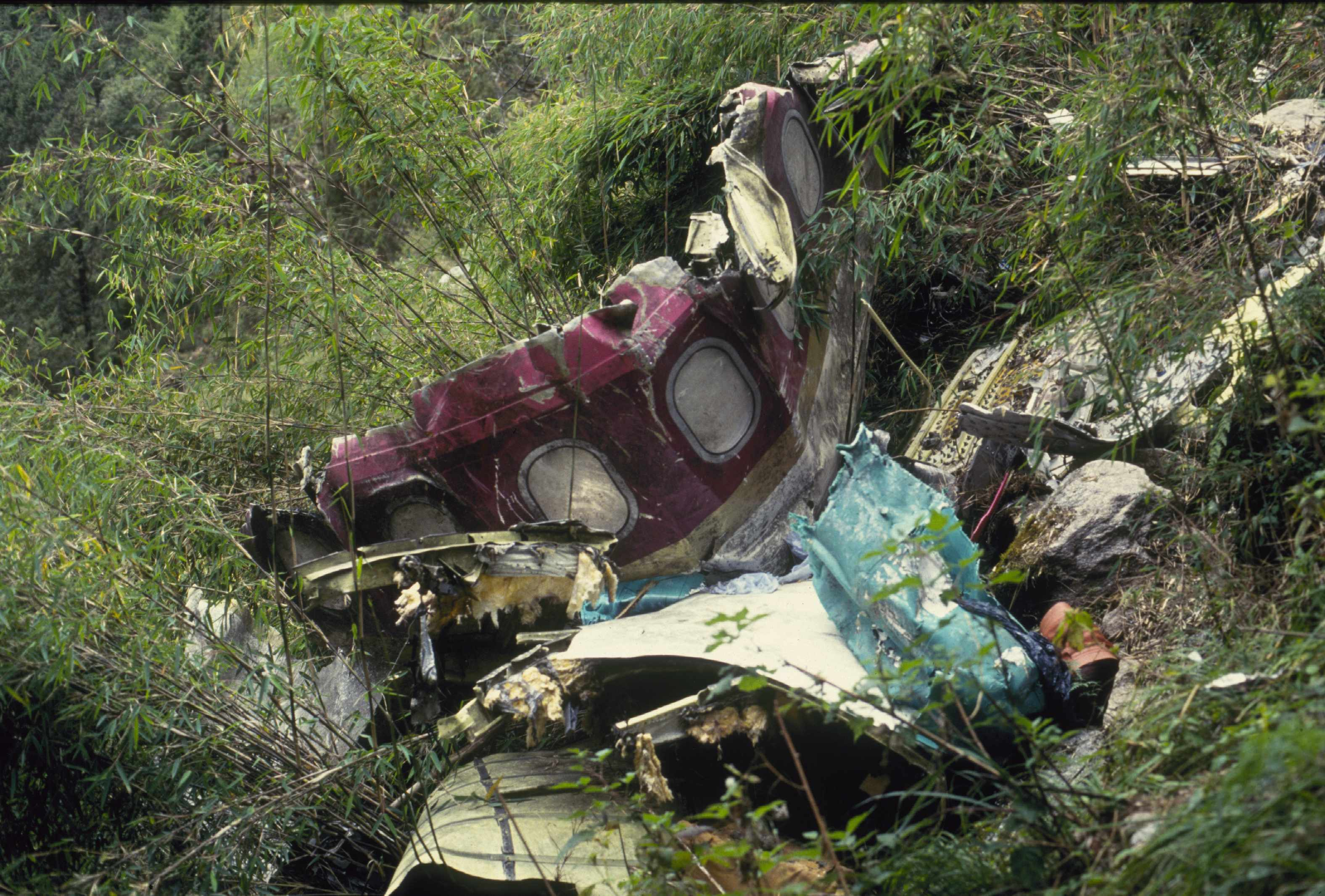
Parts of the fuselage after striking a cliff

On Friday, July 31, 1992, an Airbus A310-304 on the route, registration HS-TID, crashed on approach to Kathmandu. At 07:00:26 UTC (12:45:26 NST; 14:00:26 ICT), the aircraft crashed into the side of a mountain 23 miles (37 km) north of Kathmandu at an altitude of 11,500 ft (3,500 m) and a ground speed of 300 knots (560 km/h; 350 mph), killing all 99 passengers and 14 crew members on board. This was both the first hull loss and the first fatal accident involving the Airbus A310.

Nepalese authorities found that the probable causes of the accident were the captain and air traffic controller's loss of situational awareness; language and technical problems caused the captain to experience frustration and a high workload; the first officer's lack of initiative and inconclusive answers to the captain's questions; the air traffic controller's inexperience, poor grasp of English, and reluctance to interfere with what he saw as piloting matters such as terrain separation; poor supervision of the inexperienced air traffic controller; Thai Airways International's failure to provide simulator training for the complex Kathmandu approach to its pilots; and improper use of the aircraft's flight management system.

== Pakistan International Airlines Flight 268 ==
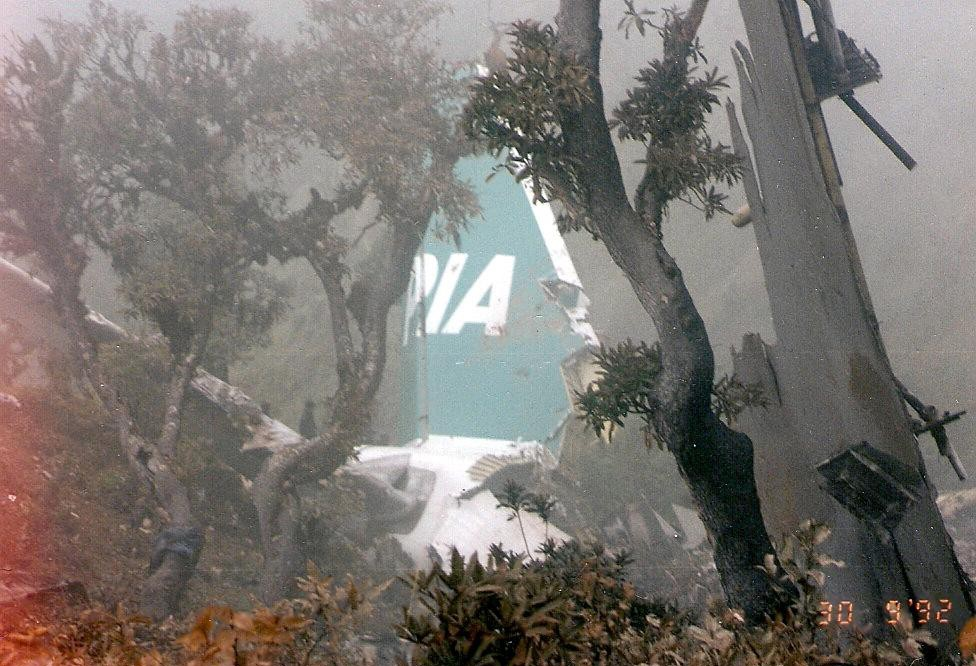
Infamous photo of the tail after inadvertently descending too early

Pakistan International Airlines Flight 268 was an Airbus A300, registration AP-BCP, which crashed while approaching Kathmandu's Tribhuvan International Airport on September 28, 1992. All 167 people on board were killed. Flight 268 is the worst crash of Pakistan International Airlines and the worst to ever occur in Nepal.

Investigators determined that the accident had been caused mainly by pilot error. Visibility was poor due to overcast and the ground proximity warning system would not have been triggered in time because of the steep terrain. The approach plates for Kathmandu issued to PIA pilots were also determined to be unclear, and Nepalese air traffic controllers were judged timid and reluctant to intervene in what they saw as piloting matters such as terrain separation. The report recommended that ICAO review navigational charts and encourage their standardization, and that the approach to Kathmandu Airport be changed to be less complex.

== 1996 Croatia USAF CT-43 crash (IFO 21) ==
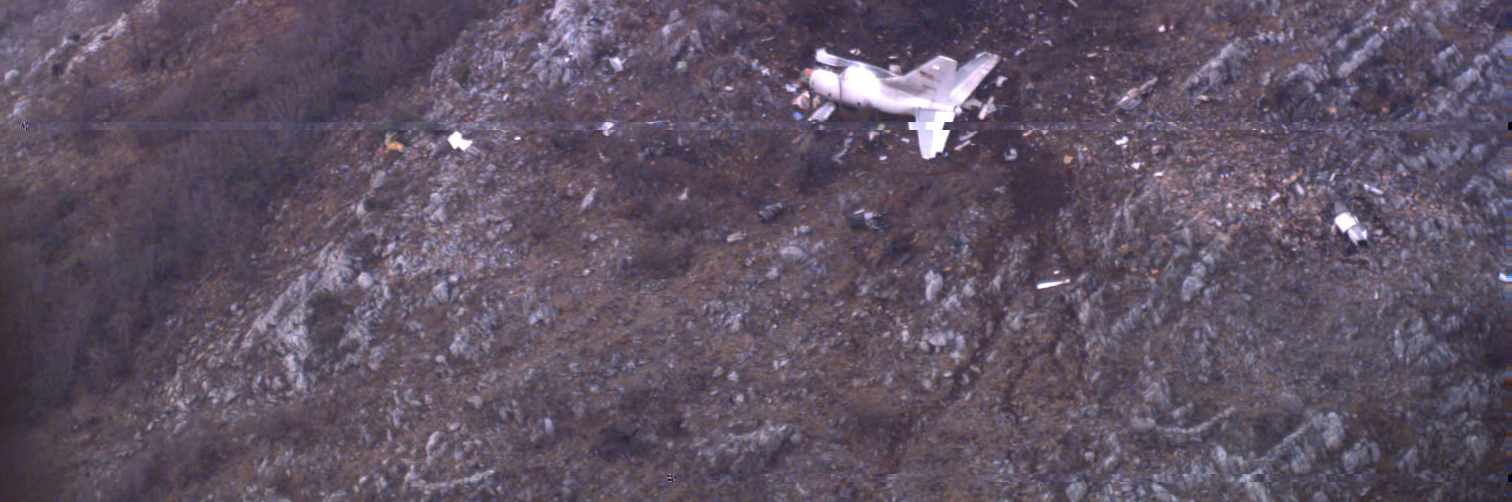
Complete overview of the crash site

On April 3, 1996, a United States Air Force Boeing CT-43A (Flight IFO-21) crashed on approach to Dubrovnik, Croatia, while on an official trade mission. The aircraft was carrying United States Secretary of Commerce Ron Brown and 34 other people. While attempting an instrument approach to Dubrovnik Airport, the airplane crashed into a mountainside. All aboard died in the crash except one who died en route to a hospital.

== Alitalia Flight 660 ==
On August 2, 1968, Alitalia Flight 660 crashed while on approach to Milan Malpensa Airport, a stopover on a flight from Rome Fiumicino Airport to Montréal–Trudeau International Airport. The aircraft, a Douglas DC-8-43 registered as I-DIWF, crashed into Mount San Giacomo. Every passenger and crew member survived the initial impact, but 12 passengers were killed by the subsequent fire.

== Korean Air Flight 803 ==
On July 27, 1989, Korean Air Flight 803, a Douglas DC-10-30 operating the flight from King Abdulaziz International Airport to Tripoli International Airport, crashed into the ground after descending below the glideslope. The investigation found that the pilots attempted to descend below the decision height under the thought that they were on the glide. The resulting crash killed 75 of the 199 people on board.

== Garuda Indonesia Flight 152 ==
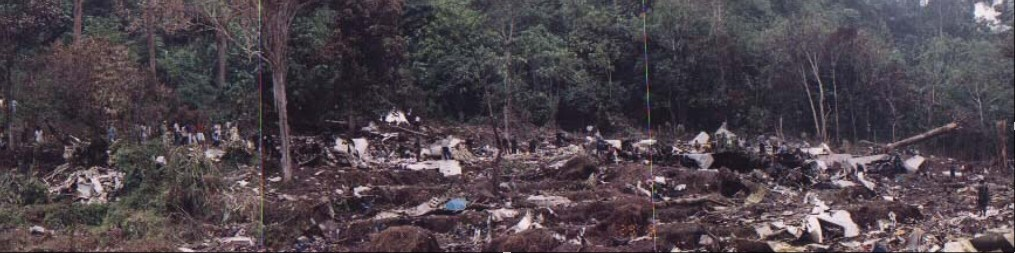
Panoramic view of the wreckage

On September 26, 1997, Garuda Indonesia Flight 152, a scheduled domestic flight operating from Soekarno–Hatta International Airport, Tangerang, to Polonia International Airport, Medan, with an Airbus A300B4-200, crashed into mountainous woodlands, killing all 222 passengers and 12 crew members on board. It is the deadliest aviation disaster in Indonesia's history.

== Avianca Flight 011 ==
On November 27, 1983, Avianca Flight 011, which was a Boeing 747-200BM Combi on an international scheduled passenger flight from Frankfurt to Bogotá via Paris, Madrid, and Caracas, crashed near Madrid while attempting an ILS approach to runway 33 at Madrid–Barajas Airport. Out of the 192 occupants, only 11 survived. It is the deadliest crash in mainland Spain's history, and the deadliest in Avianca's history.

== Smolensk air disaster ==
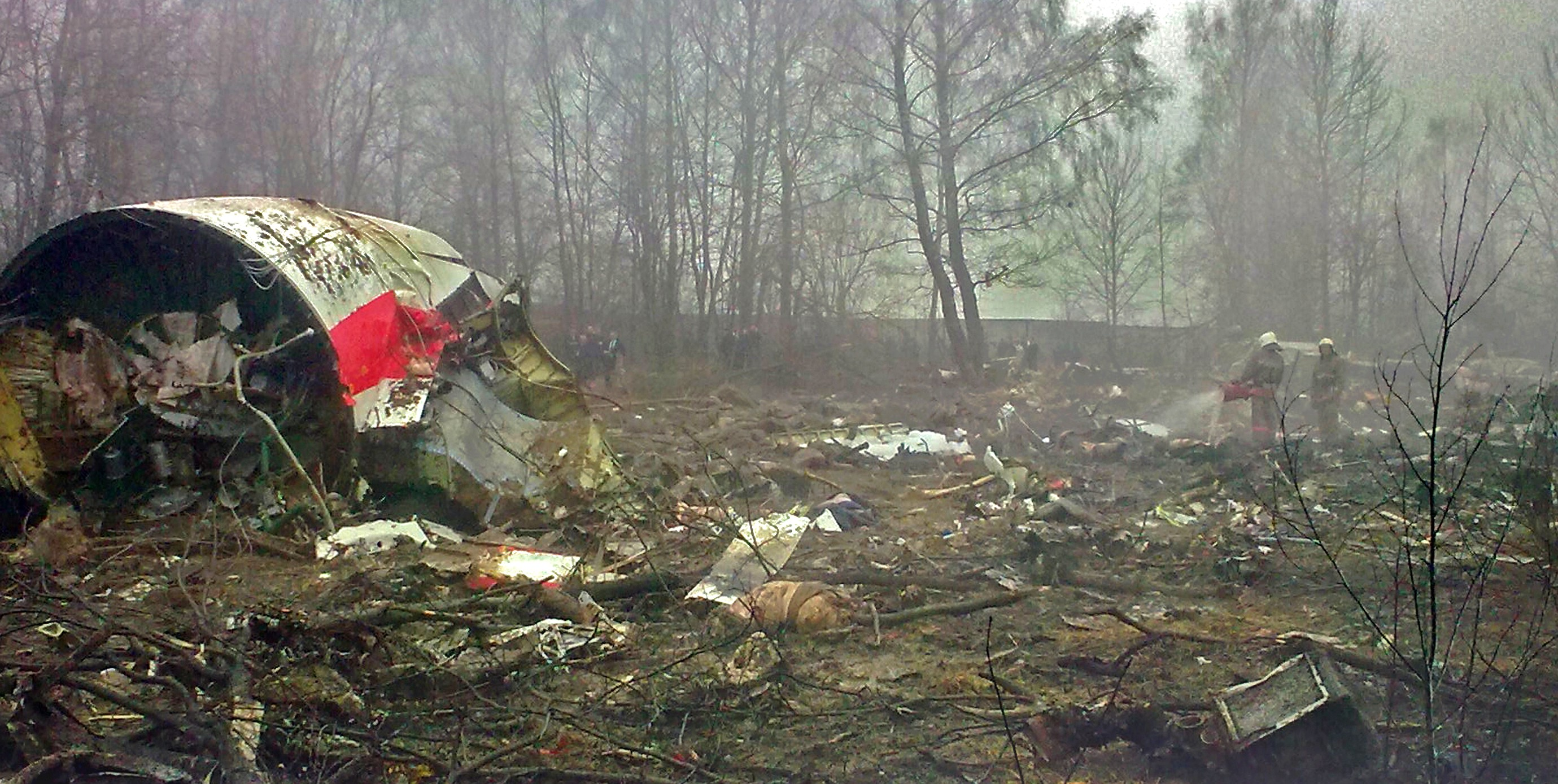
Most of the aircraft was destroyed when it flipped over

On April 10, 2010, a Tupolev Tu-154M registered as 101, operating as Polish Air Force Flight 101 crashed while on approach to Smolensk North Airport. The crash resulted in the death of all 89 government officials and 7 crew members on board. The flight was made so that the president of Poland, Lech Kaczyński, and his wife, could attend the 70th anniversary of the Katyn massacre. It is the only major accident to occur at Smolensk North Airport.

== Turkish Airlines Flight 6491 ==
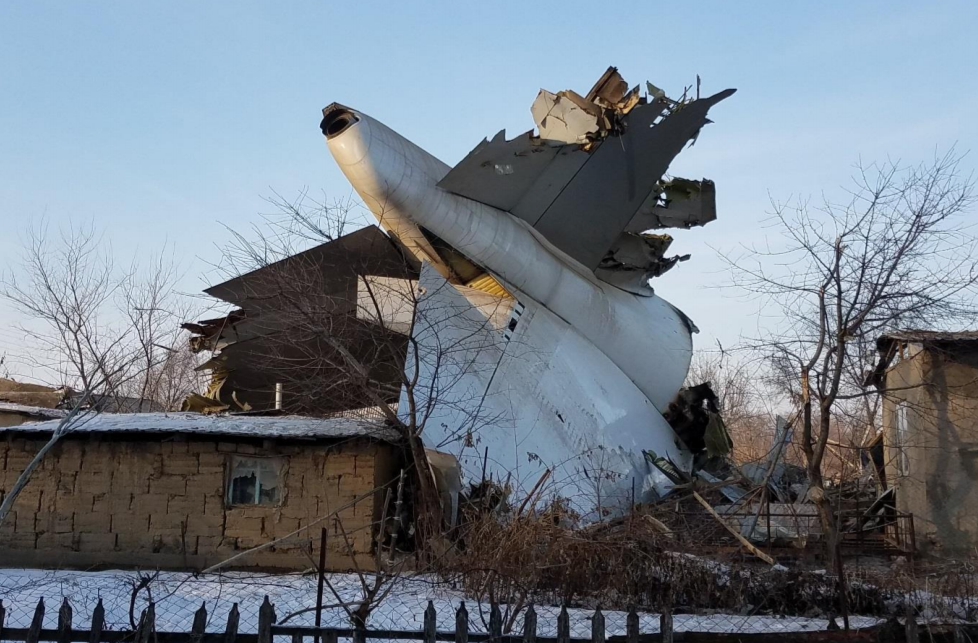
The remainder of the tail lodged into a building

On January 16, 2017, Turkish Airlines Flight 6491, a Boeing 747-412F/SCD registered TC-MCL, crashed on approach to runway 26 at Manas International Airport. The crash killed all 4 crew members and 35 civilians on the ground. It was found that the crew had locked on to the incorrect ILS signal, causing them to overshoot the runway.

== Scandinavian Airlines System Flight 933 ==
On January 13, 1969, Scandinavian Airlines Systems Flight 933 crashed on approach to Los Angeles International Airport, killing 15 of the 45 people on board. The aircraft, a Douglas DC-8-62, was partially destroyed upon impact with the water. The aircraft was later recovered from the water and scrapped.

== Independent Air Flight 1851 ==
On February 8, 1989, all 144 people onboard Independent Air Fight 1851 were killed when the aircraft, a Boeing 707-331B, flew into a mountain. The flight was operating from Orio al Serio Airport, in Italy, to Punta Cana International Airport in the Dominican Republic, with a stopover in Santa Maria Airport (Azores).

It is the deadliest aviation accident in Portugal's history.

== United Airlines Flight 2860 ==
On December 18, 1977, a United Airlines Douglas DC-8F-54 operating as Flight 2860 crashed in Davis County, Utah, killing all 3 crew members on board. It was on a cargo flight from San Francisco International Airport to O'Hare International Airport, with a stopover in Salt Lake City International Airport.

== Northwest Airlink Flight 5719 ==
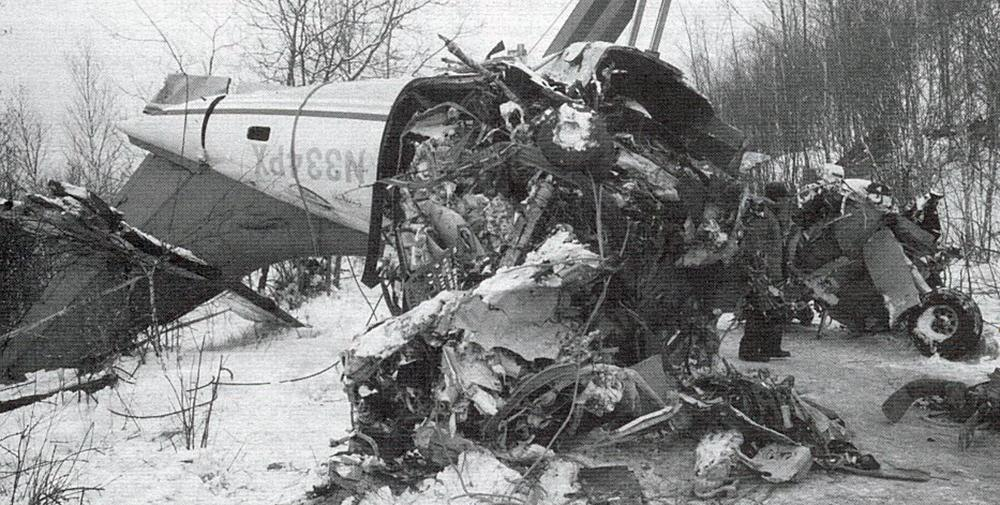
Most of the aircraft was compacted into a big piece of wreckage

On December 1, 1993, a Jetstream 31, operated by Express Airlines II as Northwest Airlink Flight 5719, collided with a group of trees in a forest during final approach to Chisholm-Hibbing Airport, and crashed into two ridges northwest of the airport, killing all sixteen passengers and the two pilots on board.

== Iberia Flight 610 ==
On February 19, 1985, Iberia Flight 610, on a regular scheduled domestic passenger flight from Madrid–Barajas Airport, to Bilbao Airport, crashed into a television antenna, slicing the left wing nearly completely off the airframe. The resulting loss of lift caused the aircraft to roll over into a dive and crash, killing all 141 passengers and 7 crew.

This crash is the deadliest crash in Iberia's history and in the history of Basque Country.

== Martinair Flight 138 ==
On December 4, 1974, a charter flight from Surabaya to Jeddah with a stopover in Colombo operating as Martinair Flight 138 crashed while on approach to Colombo, killing all 191 people on board. The aircraft involved, a DC-8, was destroyed.

This is the deadliest accident in Sri Lanka's history.

== Alitalia Flight 404 ==
On November 14, 1990, a McDonnell Douglas DC-9-32 registered as I-ATJA, crashed into a mountain while operating as Alitalia Flight 404, killing all 46 occupants on board and destroying the aircraft. The investigation by Swiss authorities revealed that while pilot error was a factor, it was found that the NAV receiver had failed, causing the aircraft to appear to be 1,000 feet (300 m) above the ground, although they were only feet from the trees on the ground. This also inhibited the GPWS warnings from sounding. It is also believed that the crew misread their drum-point altimeter, causing them to overestimate their height.

== Trigana Air Flight 267 ==
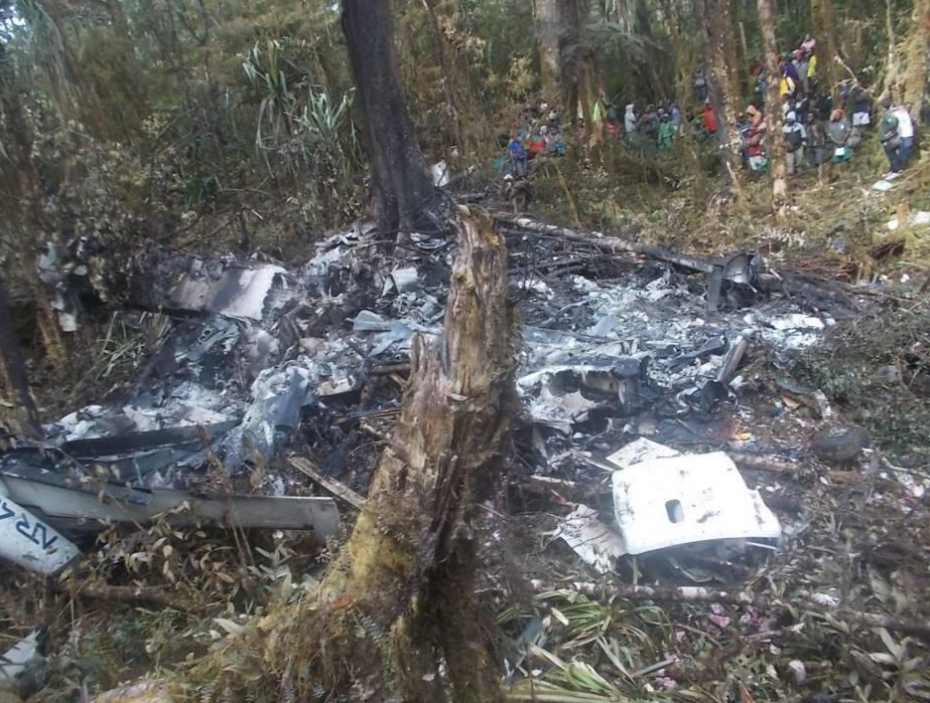
The aftermath of Flight 267

On August 16, 2015, Trigana Air Flight 267, an ATR 42-300 registered as PK-YRN, crashed into Mount Tangok shortly before landing at Oksibil Airport, Oksibil, Indonesia, killing all 49 passengers and 5 crew members on board. The final report stated that the pilots purposefully deviated from the original flight path. The lowest safe altitude was ignored and the Enhanced Ground Proximity Warning System (EGPWS) was disabled.

== 2006 New York City Cirrus SR20 crash ==
On October 11, 2006, the New York Yankees' pitcher Cory Lidle and his flight instructor were killed when their Cirrus SR20, registered as N929CD, crashed into the Belaire Apartments in New York City. The weather that day was less than desirable and the corridor required strict clearance to enter, causing a sharp turn which led to the impact.

== Lion Air Flight 904 ==
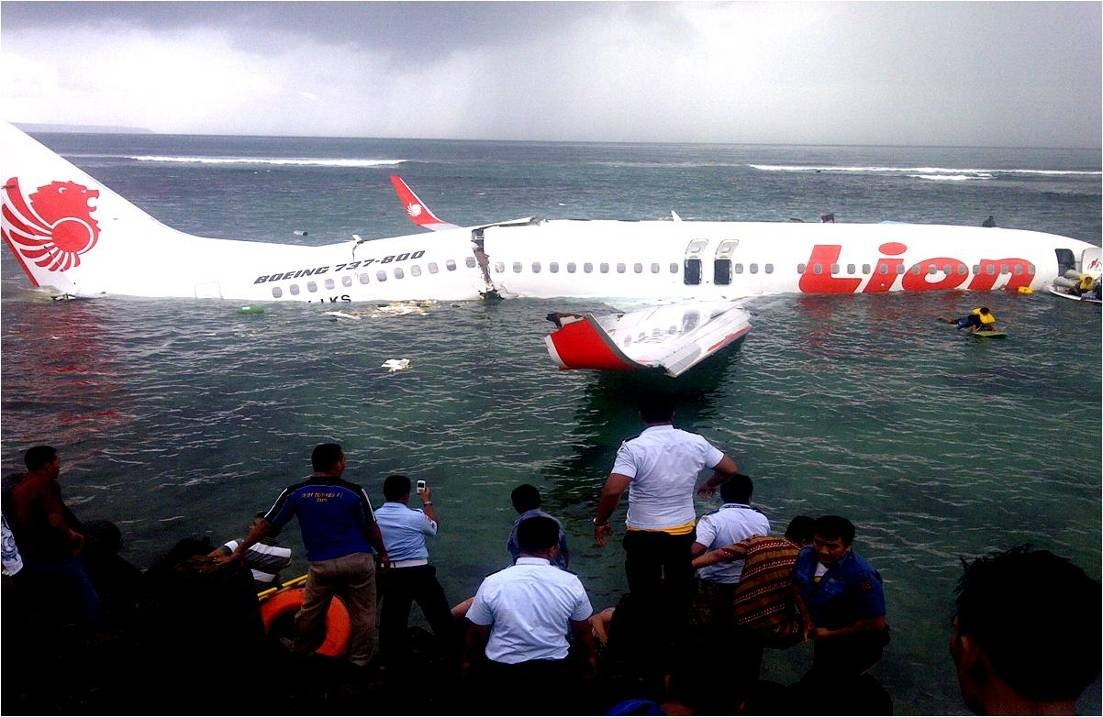
The fuselage split in two after hitting the water

On April 13, 2013, Lion Air Flight 904, a Boeing 737-8GP registered as PK-LKS, accidentally ditched shortly before landing at Ngurah Rai International Airport, Denpasar, Indonesia. No one out of the 101 passengers and the 7 crew members died, however, 46 were injured. The pilots failed to follow the glide path and unintentionally descended below it. When the pilots realized their mistake, they tried to go-around, however, it was too late.

== Air Niugini Flight 73 ==
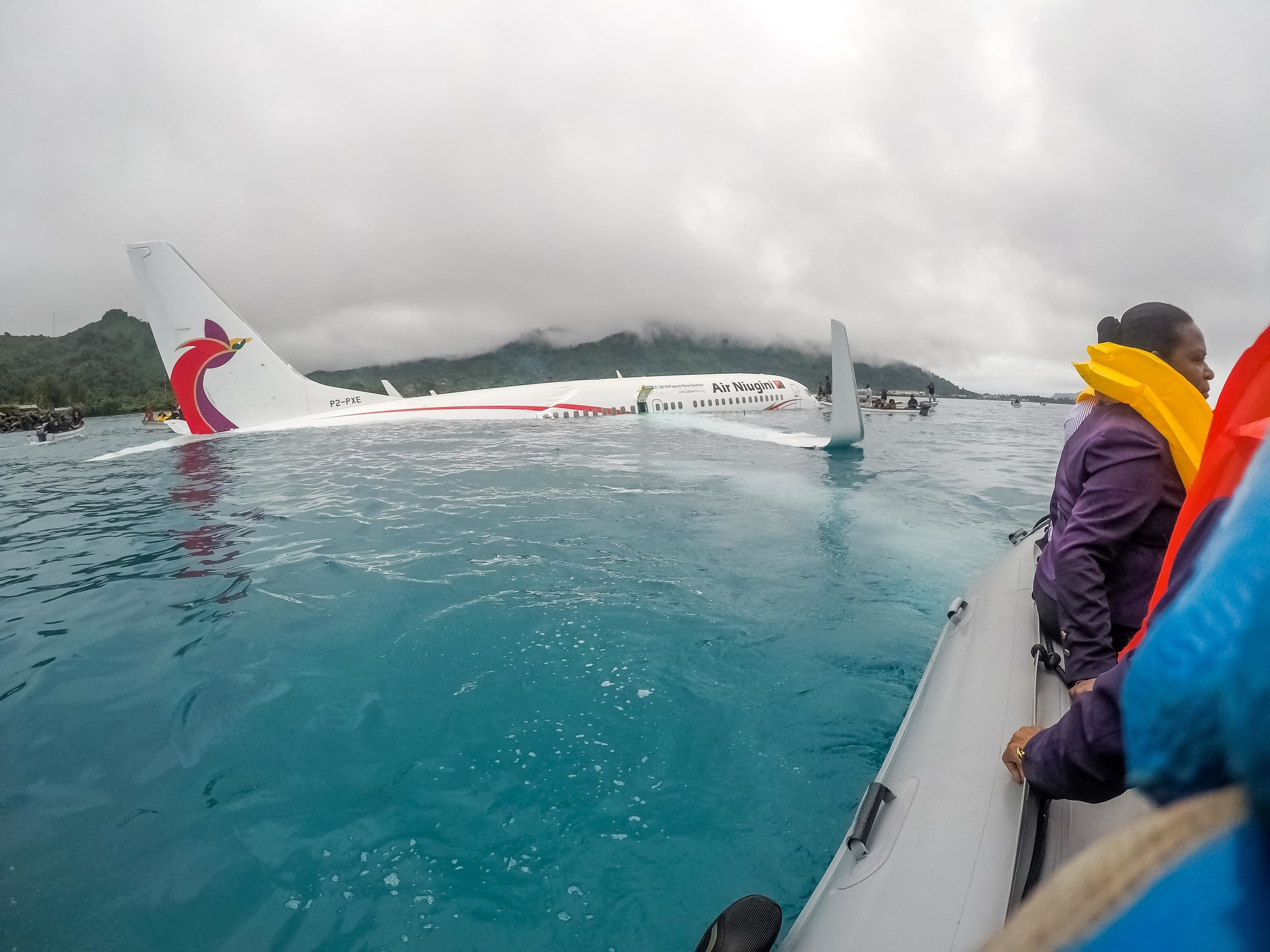
Most of the passengers were rescued by local fishermen after the impact

On September 28, 2018, Air Niugini Flight 73, a Boeing 737-8BK registered as P2-PXE, accidentally ditched shortly before landing at Chuuk International Airport, Weno, Micronesia. Out of the 47 occupants on board, 1 was killed. When on approach, the pilots lost situation awareness and the aircraft fell below the glide path. As a result, the aircraft hit the waters.

== Aloha IslandAir Flight 1712 ==
On October 28, 1989, Aloha IslandAir Flight 1712, de Havilland Canada DHC-6 Twin Otter 300 registered as N707PV, crashed into mountains at an elevation of about 600 feet (180 m) at night near Molokai Airport, Hawaii, United States, killing all 20 occupants on board. The captain's decision to fly into instrument meteorological conditions was one of the main reasons why the flight crashed.

== Turkish Airlines Flight 452 ==
On September 19, 1976, Turkish Airlines Flight 452, a Boeing 727-200 registered as TC-JBH, crashed on approach to Antalya Airport, Turkey, killing all 154 people on board. Investigation revealed that, during the night, the pilots mistook Isparta's city lights for the runway causing the pilots to descend early.

== Prinair Flight 277 ==
On March 5, 1969, a de Havilland DH.114 Heron 2B registered as N563PR operating as Prinair Flight 277 to San Juan, Puerto Rico, crashed while on approach into trees on the Sierra Luquillo mountains, killing all 19 people on board. The investigation found that the pilots were given incorrect instructions to conduct the approach by the air traffic controller, causing them to fly into the mountains.

== Santa Bàrbara Airlines Flight 518 ==
On February 21, 2008, Santa Bàrbara Airlines Flight 518, an ATR 42 registered as YV1449, impacted terrain shortly after take-off from Alberto Carnevalli Airport killing all 46 people on board. After experiencing delays from departure, the pilots skipped the pre-flight procedures causing the attitude and heading reference system (AHRS) to be inoperative. Because of the inoperative AHRS, the pilots cannot tell the correct heading. The pilots used an unauthorized flight route and heavy clouds, which was present during the time of the accident, obscured rising terrain until it was too late to avoid it.

== Avianca Flight 410 ==
On March 17, 1988, Avianca Flight 410, a Boeing 727-21 registered as HK-1716, crashed into El Espartillo mountain shortly after take-off from Camilo Daza International Airport, Colombia, killing all 143 people on board. A pilot who was not part of the flight crew was present at the cockpit during the time of the accident which distracted the flight crew from flying duties.

== 1975 Agadir Royal Air Maroc Boeing 707 crash ==
On August 3. 1975, a Boeing 707-321C operated by Alia Royal Jordanian on behalf of Royal Air Maroc, registered as JY-AEE, crashed in the Atlas Mountains while on approach to Inezgane Airport, killing all 181 passengers and 7 crew members on board. It was revealed that the crew had not flown the regular route into the approach corridor, causing them to fly into the mountains.

This crash is the deadliest involving a Boeing 707 and the deadliest in Morocco's history.

== 2023 Coulson Aviation Boeing 737 crash ==
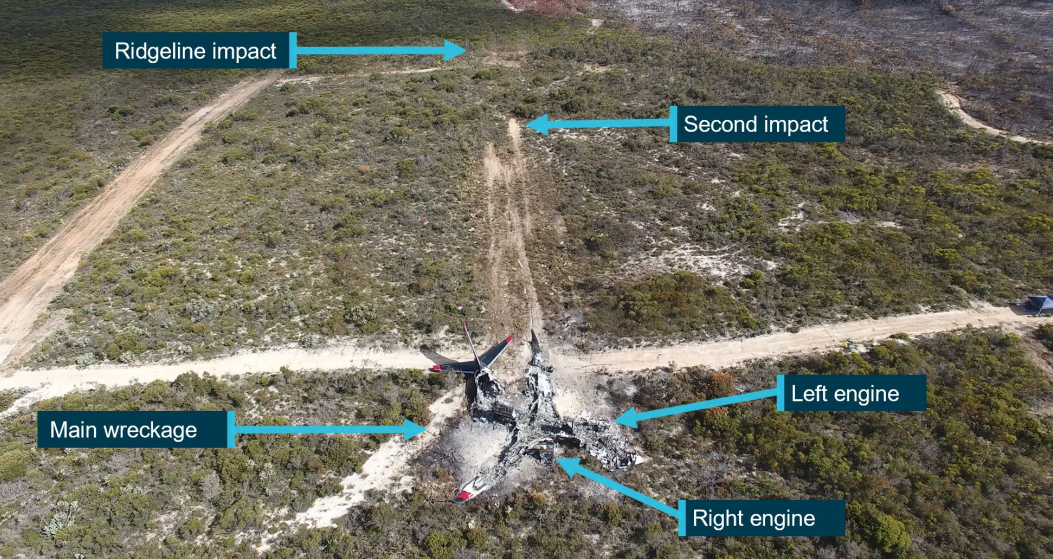
Overview of the burnt out wreckage with labels

On February 6, 2023, a firefighting Boeing 737-3H4 operated by Coulson Aviation (Australia) registered as N619SW crashed while fighting fires in southern Australia. Both crew members survived the impact and were able to evacuate without serious injuries. It was found that the crew hadn't given the engines sufficient time to spool up, causing a stall.

== Crossair Flight 3597 ==
On November 24, 2001, an Avro RJ100 registered as HB-IXM operating as Crossair Flight 3597 slammed into wooded hills approximately 2.5 miles (4.1 km) from runway 14 at Zurich Airport, killing 24 of the 33 people on board. The resulting investigation blamed a number of factors for the accident including fatigue, improper training, and shady airlines procedures that allowed the captain to be employed.

== Eastern Air Lines Flight 212 ==
On September 11, 1974, Eastern Air Lines Flight 212 operating on a regularly scheduled passenger flight in a McDonnell Douglas DC-9-31 registered as N8984E, crashed while on approach to Douglas Municipal Airport, killing 72 of the 82 people on board. The crew had strayed away from flight topics and were discussing non-essential topics. This crash also left the FAA to enforce the Sterile Cockpit Rule, which prohibits non-essential topics being talked about while under 10,000 ft.

== 1948 KLM Constellation air disaster ==
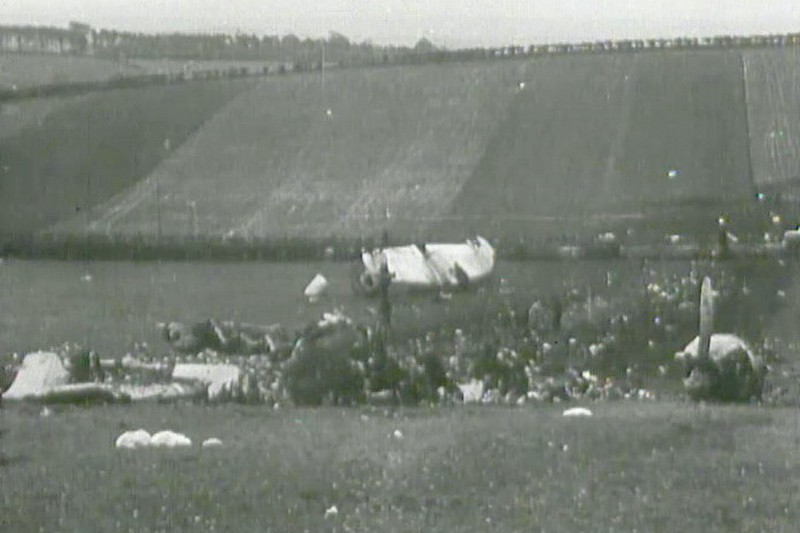
The most intact piece of wreckage was the engines.

On October 20, 1948, a Lockheed L-049-46-25 Constellation operated by KLM registered as PH-TEN crashed into hilly terrain while attempting to make an emergency landing at Prestwick Airport, killing all 40 occupants. While it was found that the pilots had descended too low, and by the time they tried to go around, they hit power lines, causing parts of the aircraft to light on fire. The pilots also had inaccurate charts, which led them into the terrain.

== Delta Air Lines Flight 723 ==
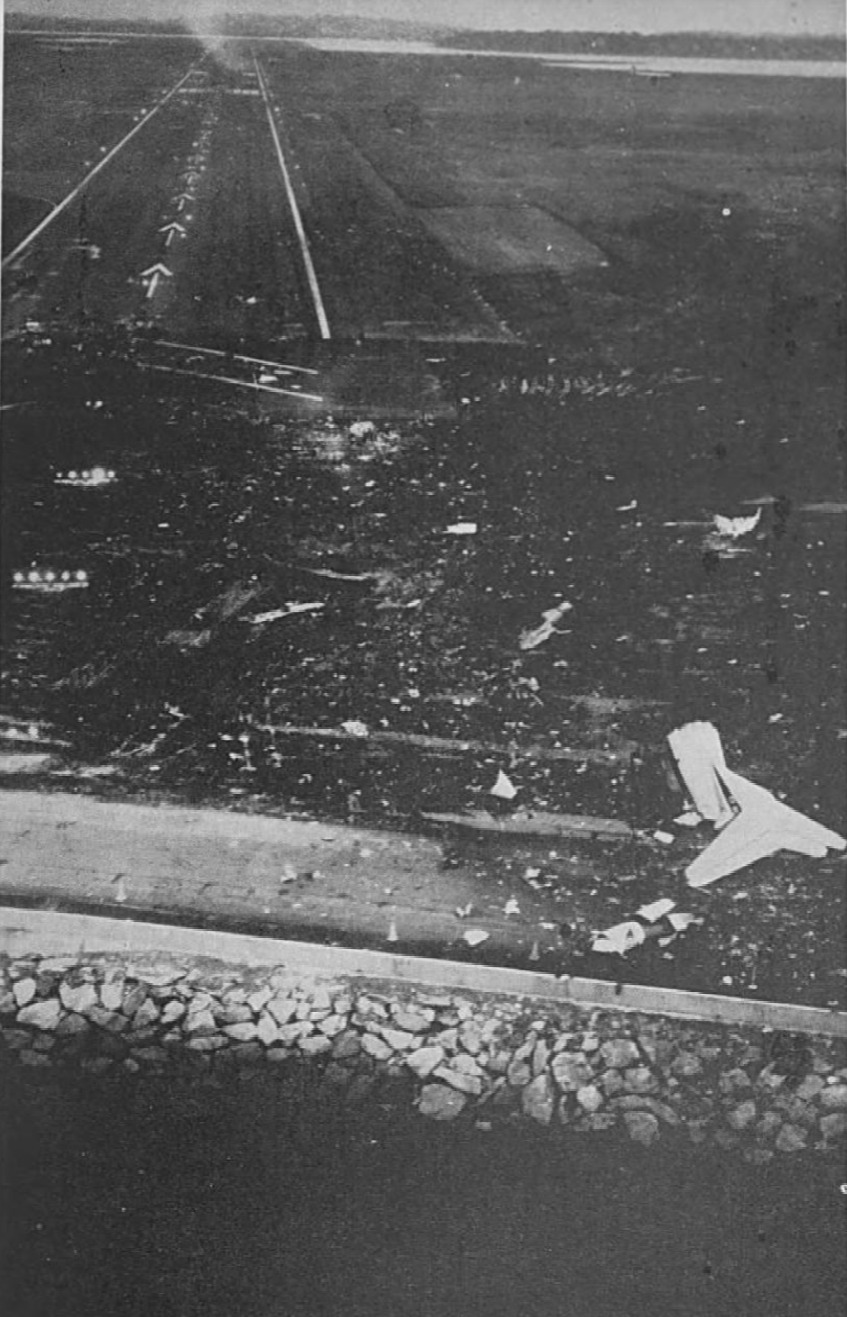
The tail section was the only intact section of the aircraft

On July 31, 1973, Delta Air Lines Flight 723, a domestic passenger flight operated by a McDonnell Douglas DC-9-31 registered as N975NE crashed into a seawall, resulting in the deaths of all 89 occupants, including an initial survivor who died of his injuries more than 4 months after the crash. It was found that the crew hadn't made the necessary altitude callouts, causing them to descend below the glideslope, compounded by the unusual ATC actions while guiding the flight.

== Aviateca Flight 901 ==
On August 9, 1995, a Boeing 737-2H6 operating as Aviateca Flight 901, registered as N125GU with 65 occupants crashed into the San Vicente volcano, killing all 65 occupants on board. The investigation found that the crew made multiple errors that led them to where they ended up, and the air traffic controller didn't alert them to this error, contributing to the accident.

== American Airlines Flight 383 (1965) ==
On November 8, 1965, American Airlines Flight 383 operating on a scheduled domestic passenger flight from LaGuardia Airport in New York, to Cincinnati/Northern Kentucky International Airport in Ohio. The aircraft operating the flight, a Boeing 727-23 registered as N1996 crashed into a hill approximately 2 miles (3 km) north of the runway, killing 58 of the 62 occupants on board.

The total sequence of events that caused the accident were never positively determined, but it is thought that the crew confused lights on the houses below as the runway lights, causing a sharp descent in an attempt to make what they thought was the runway.

== TWA Flight 3 ==
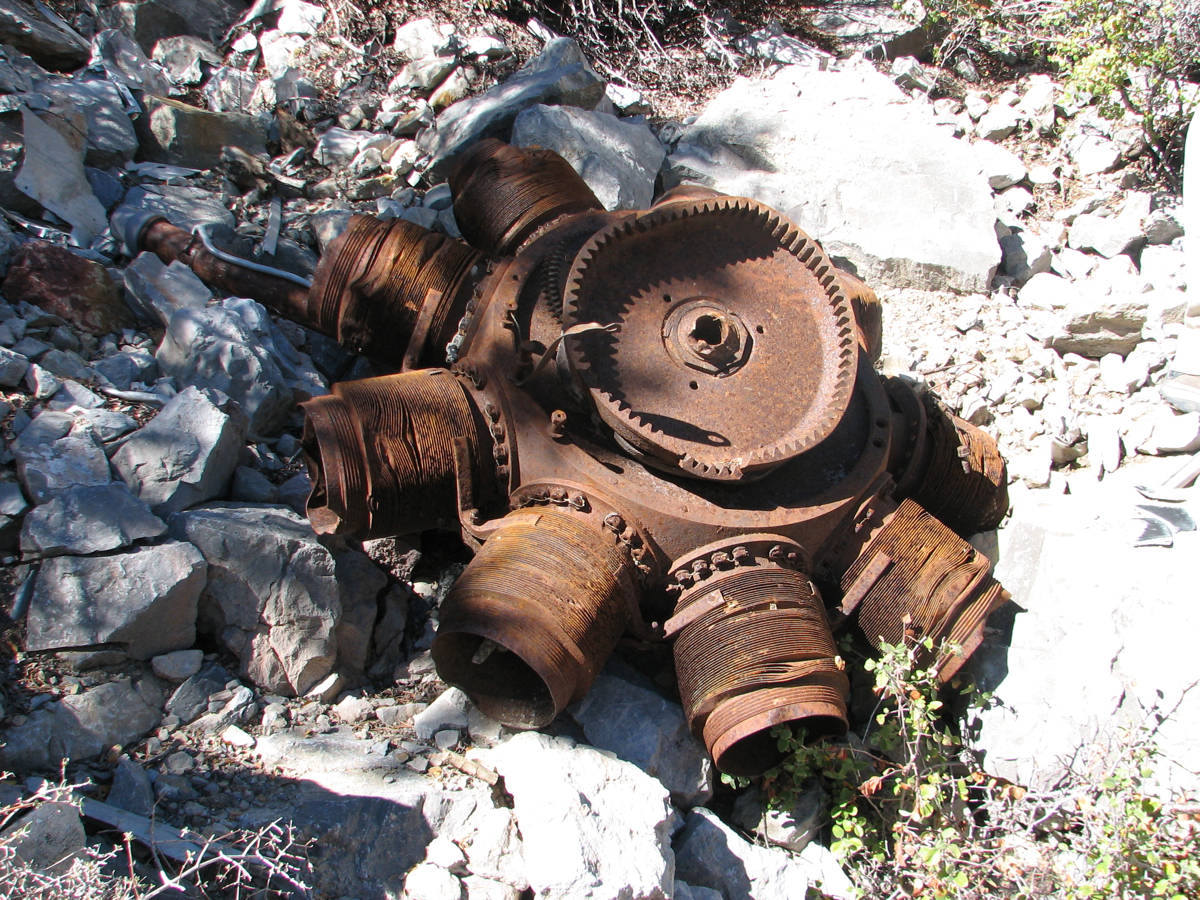
One of the two engines recovered in 2007

On January 16, 1942, a Douglas DC-3-382 registered as NC1946 operating as Transcontinental & Western Air Flight 3 carrying famous American actress Carole Lombard crashed into Potosi Mountain in Nevada, killing her and the other 21 occupants on board. It was found that the captain had not signed off on the flight plan, and might have flown on the wrong heading because he wasn't familiar with the route from Las Vegas and was familiar with Boulder City.

== TANS Perú Flight 204 ==
On August 23, 2005, TANS Perú Flight 204, a Boeing 737-244 Advanced registered as OB-1809-P, operating a scheduled domestic passenger flight within Peru, crashed while on approach into Captain Rolden International Airport in poor weather, killing 40 of the 98 occupants. The captain was faulted for choosing to continue the approach while being aware about adverse weather conditions and not following standard airline procedure.

== Korean Air Lines Flight 015 ==
Korean Air Lines Flight 015 was a scheduled international passenger flight operating from Los Angeles International Airport in California, United States, to Gimpo International Airport in Gimpo, South Korea, with a stopover in Anchorage International Airport, Alaska. On November 19, 1980, the aircraft involved, a Boeing 747-2B5B, crashed while on approach into Anchorage, killing 14 of the 226 people on board. 1 person on the ground was killed.

== Air China Flight 129 ==
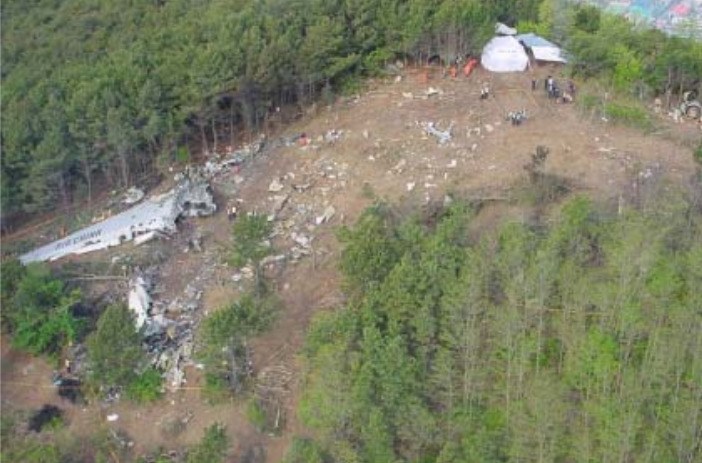
Overview of the crash site

Air China Flight 129 was a scheduled international passenger flight that departed from Beijing Capital International Airport in China to Gimhae International Airport in South Korea. On April 15, 2002, the Boeing 767-2J6ER registered as B-2552 that was operating the flight crashed into Mount Dotdae, killing 129 of the 166 people on board. The investigation found that the crew had failed to execute a missed approach until five seconds before the impact.

== Nepal Airlines Flight 183 ==
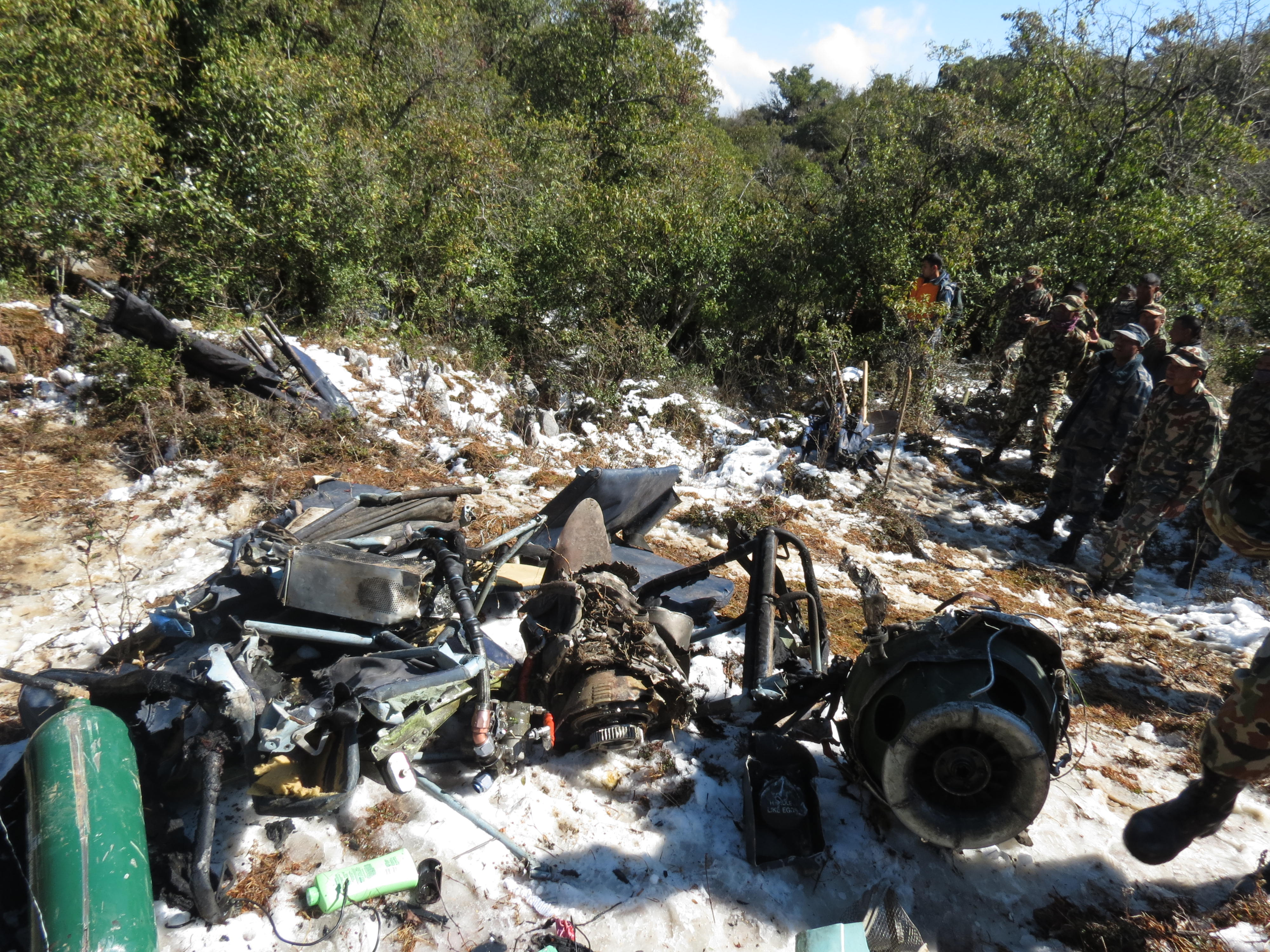
The partial remains of the aircraft

Nepal Airlines Flight 183 was a scheduled domestic passenger flight operating from Pokhara Airport to Jumla Airport within the country of Nepal. On February 16, 2014, the aircraft involved, a De Havilland Canada DHC-6 Twin Otter 300 registered as JN-ABB crashed in Dhikura, a town within the Arghakhanchi District, killing all 18 occupants on board. The aircraft had been attempting to divert and got lost within the bad weather, causing them to stray off course and become lost while being complicated by the fact that the crew had lost the ability to contact the ground due to being off course and out of range.

== Air India Flight 101 ==
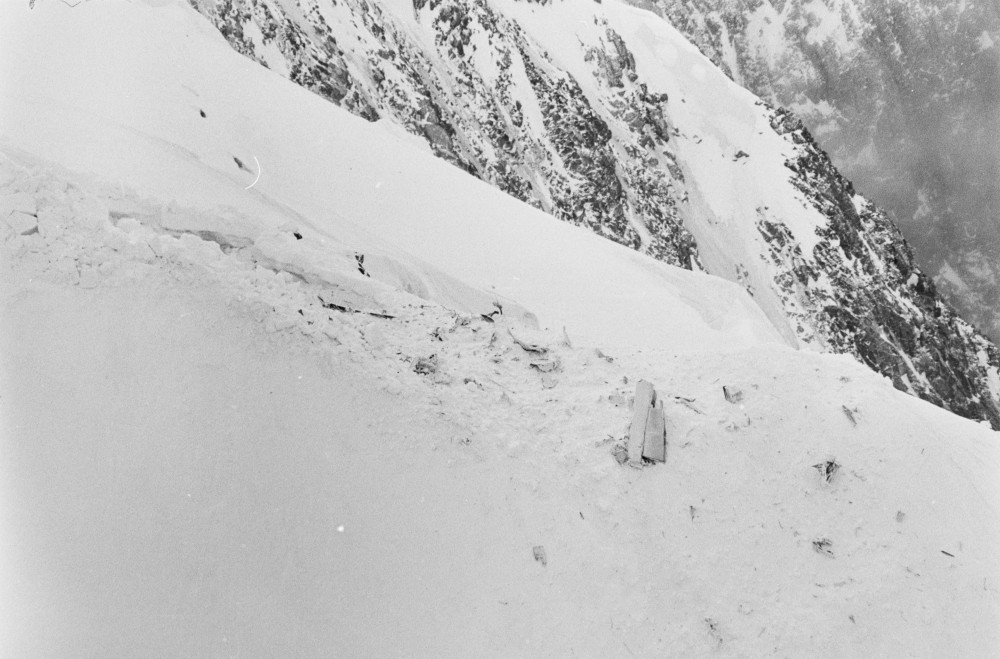
The aircraft was mostly reduced to small parts

Air India Flight 101 was a scheduled international passenger flight operating from Bombay-Santacruz Airport in India to Heathrow Airport in the United Kingdom with stopovers at Delhi International Airport in India, Beirut International Airport in Lebanon, and Geneva International Airport in Switzerland. On January 24, 1966, the Boeing 707-437 operating the flight registered as VT-DMN crashed in the Mont Blanc massif in France, killing all 117 people on board. The investigation found that the pilots had started their descent under the thought that they had passed the mountain range, being led by a malfunctioning VOR receiver. Therefore, the pilots started their descent before they had passed the mountain range, causing them to impact the mountains.

== TWA Flight 128 ==
TWA Flight 128 was a scheduled domestic passenger flight within the United States flying from Los Angeles International Airport to Logan International Airport with stopovers at Cincinnati International Airport and Pittsburgh International Airport. On November 20, 1967, the aircraft operating the flight, a Convair 880 registered as N821TW crashed into a hill short of the runway at Cincinnati, killing 70 of the 82 occupants. The investigation faulted the crew for the accident because they were attempting to make a visual approach at night in poor visibility, which ultimately caused the accident.

== First Air Flight 6560 ==
First Air Flight 6560 was a scheduled domestic passenger flight within Canada operating from Yellowknife Airport to Resolute Bay Airport. On August 20, 2011, the Boeing 737-210C operating the flight registered as C-GNWN crashed approximately 1.2 miles (1.9 km) east of the airport, killing 12 of the 15 occupants, The three survivors were quickly rescued because the 2011 Operation Nanook military operation was happening nearby. It was found that the crew were relying on a faulty compass that led them off course and eventually into the ground.

== Corporate Airlines Flight 5966 ==
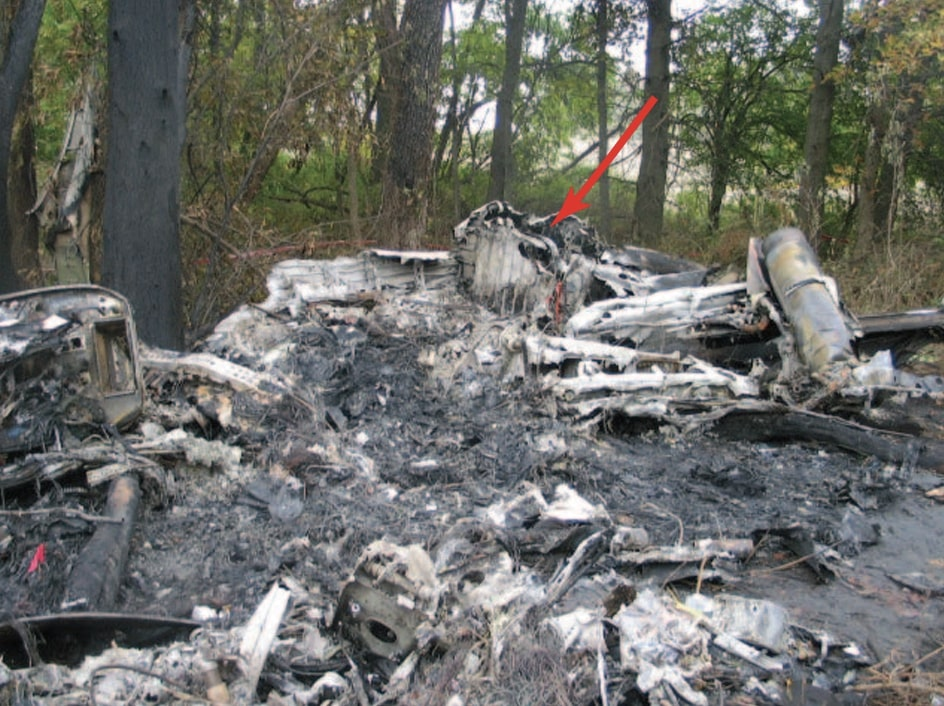
The wreckage was heavily burnt after the passengers escaped

Corporate Airlines Flight 5966 was a regularly scheduled domestic passenger flight operated by Corporate Airlines doing business as American Eagle within the United States of America. The flight was operating from St. Louis Lambert International Airport to Kirksville Regional Airport in the state of Missouri. On October 14, 2004, the aircraft operating the flight, a British Aerospace Jetstream 32 registered as N875JX, crashed while on approach into Kirksville, killing 13 of the 15 occupants. The pilots were faulted for failing to crosscheck their altitude as they descended.

== Braathens SAFE Flight 239 ==
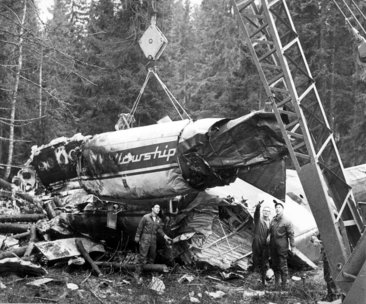
The wreckage was salvaged quickly after

Braathens SAFE Flight 239 was a domestic passenger passenger flight within the country of Norway operated by Braathens SAFE. The flight was from Ålesund Airport, Vigra to Oslo Airport, Fornebu. On December 23, 1972, the aircraft, a Fokker F28 Fellowship 1000 registered as LN-SUY, crashed while on approach into Oslo, killing 41 of the 45 occupants. It was found that the crew had made a navigational error somewhere in the flight and false signals from a radio beacon that the crew were relying on to get lined up with the runway.

== Inex-Adria Aviopromet Flight 1308 ==
On December 1, 1981, Inex-Adria Aviopromet Flight 1308, a Yugoslavian charter passenger flight originating from Brnik Airport, Ljubljana, the capital of modern-day Slovenia, was flying to Campo dell'Oro Airport, Ajaccio, Corsica France. While on final approach to Campo dell'Oro Airport, the McDonnell Douglas MD-82 crashed into Mont San-Pietro, killing all 180 occupants, making it the deadliest aviation accident involving a McDonnell Douglas MD-80 series aircraft. It was also the first fatal accident involving the aircraft. The cause of the crash was due to a series of misunderstandings and a lack of clear communications between the crew and air traffic control. The crew were also unfamiliar with the airport and vicinity.

== Surinam Airways Flight 764 ==
On June 7, 1989, Surinam Airways Flight 764, an international scheduled passenger flight originating from Amsterdam Airport Schiphol, Amsterdam Netherlands, was flying to Johan Adolf Pengel Int'l Airport, Paramaribo, Suriname. The aircraft, a McDonnell Douglas DC-8-62, had 178 passengers and 9 crew members. At 04:27 local time, the outboard right wing of Flight 764 collided with trees, shearing it off, causing the plane to roll over and crash inverted. It crashed approximately 28 miles (45 kilometers) south of its destination, and only 11 passengers of the 187 people on board survived. The plane crashed due to the captain's "glaring carelessness and recklessness" in flying below minimum altitudes during the approach. As of 2025, it remains the deadliest aviation accident in Suriname history, and is the second deadliest aviation accident in South America, behind TAM Airlines Flight 3054, with 199 fatalities.

== Piedmont Airlines Flight 230 ==
Piedmont Airlines Flight 230 was a scheduled domestic passenger flight within the United States operating from Louisville International Airport in Kentucky to Roanoke–Blacksburg Regional Airport in Virginia. The flight had stopovers at Cincinnati and Charleston. On August 10, 1968, the aircraft operating the flight, a Fairchild Hiller FH-227B registered as N712U crashed approximately 360 ft from the runway threshold before igniting, bouncing, and banking off to the right. The aircraft ended to the right of runway 23 at Charleston. 35 of the 37 occupants were killed. It was found that during the crew's short time within fog, they failed to properly monitor their altitude until it was too late.

== 2009 Aviastar British Aerospace 146 crash ==
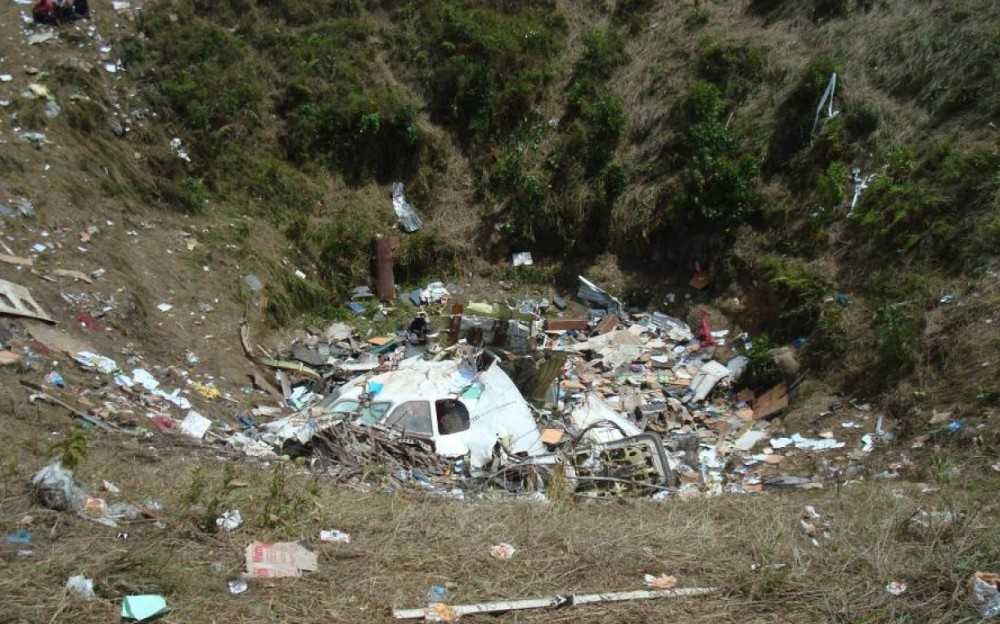
The remains of the cockpit

On April 9, 2009, a British Aerospace 146-300 operating on a domestic ferry flight by Aviastar crashed while on approach into Wamena Airport in Indonesia. The flight was operating from Sentani Airport to Wamena. The flight was carrying voting papers and other airline cargo. The investigation found that the captain failed to respond to the co-pilot's attempts to inform him about oncoming terrain. The investigation also stated that a contributing factor was that the pilots weren't sufficiently trained on GPWS warnings and terrain evasion.

== TWA Flight 514 ==
Trans World Airlines Flight 514 was a domestic scheduled flight of Trans World Airlines from Indianapolis, Indiana, and Columbus, Ohio, to Washington National Airport. On December 1, 1974, the Boeing 727-231 serving the flight was diverted to Washington Dulles International Airport but crashed into Mount Weather, Virginia. All 92 occupants aboard, 85 passengers and 7 crew members, died. In stormy conditions late in the morning, the aircraft was in controlled flight and struck a low mountain 25 nautical miles (46 km; 29 mi) northwest of its revised destination.

The accident was one of two crashes involving Boeing 727 aircraft in the United States that day, the other being the crash of Northwest Orient Airlines Flight 6231 later that evening near Haverstraw, New York.

== Pacific Western Airlines Flight 3801 ==
Pacific Western Airlines Flight 3801 was an chartered international cargo flight for Trans International Airlines. The flight was from Athens International Airport in Greece, to Edmonton International Airport in Canada. There were 4 stopovers, which were at Los Rodeos Airport in the Canary Islands, Santa Maria Airport in the Azores, Greater Moncton International Airport and Toronto International Airport, both of which are in Canada. On January 2, 1973, the aircraft operating the flight, a Boeing 707-321C crashed while on approach into Edmonton, killing all 5 people on board and all 86 of the cattle on board. The investigation revealed that the pilots were extremely fatigued and inexperienced, making a backdoor ILS approach in terrible weather. The captain is thought to have been distracted by an electrical fault pointed out by the flight engineer, leaving the co-pilot to control the plane. However, the investigators believe that during this short period of time, he reverted from 707 procedures to 737 procedures.

== Vietnam Airlines Flight 815 ==
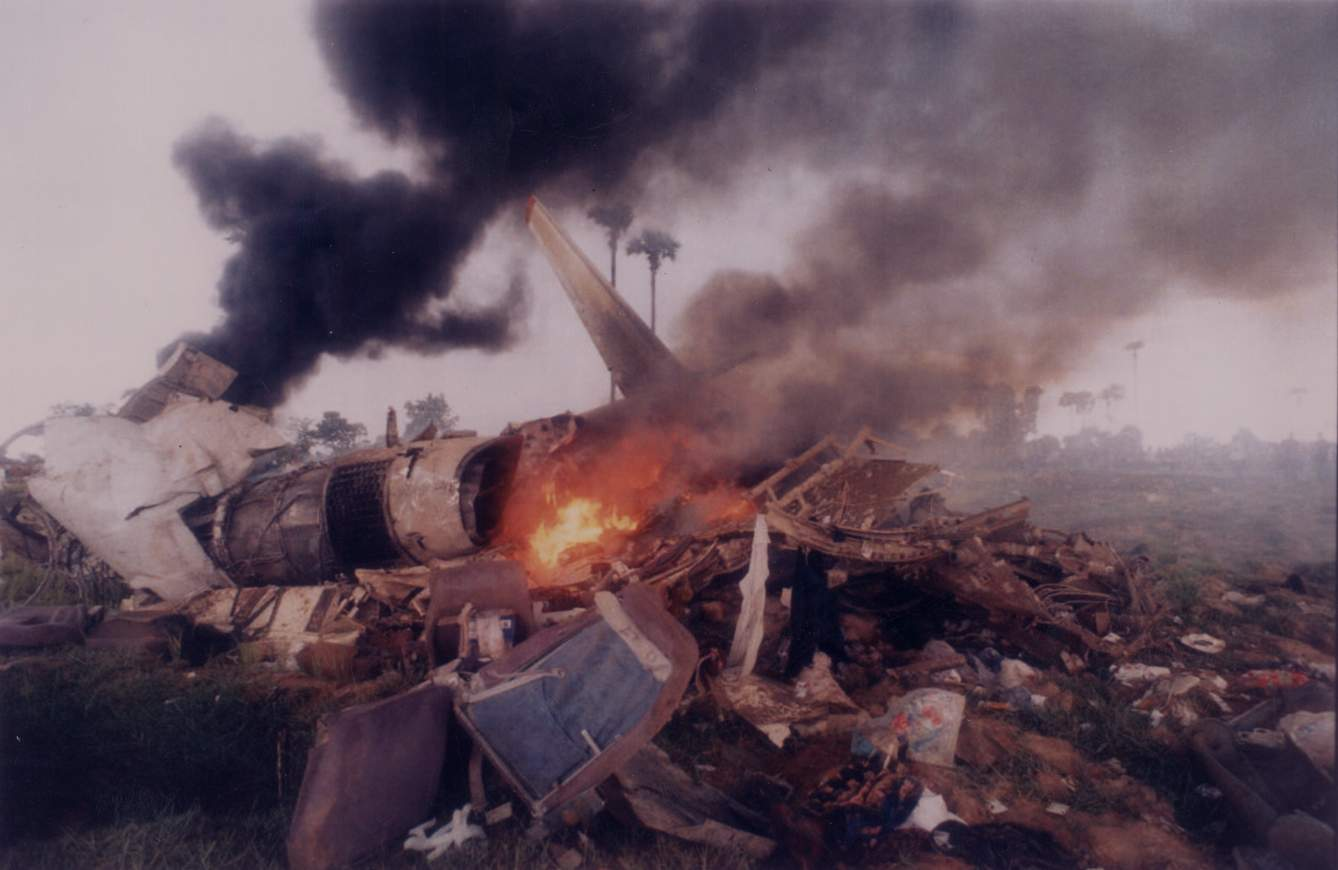
Some of the wreckage became cluttered together after the accident

Vietnam Airlines Flight 815 was a scheduled international passenger flight operating from Tan Son Nhat International Airport in Vietnam to Pochentong International Airport in Cambodia. On September 3, 1997, the aircraft flying the route, a Tupolev Tu-134B-3 registered as VN-A120, crashed while attempting to land at Pochentong Int'l, killing 65 of the 66 occupants, leaving one 14 month old girl to be the sole survivor. The reason for the crash was blamed on pilot error and a lack of CRM, mainly by the captain, who ignored the other crew members advice to go around and failed to inform them what his intentions were before the crash.

== Japan Air Lines Flight 2 ==
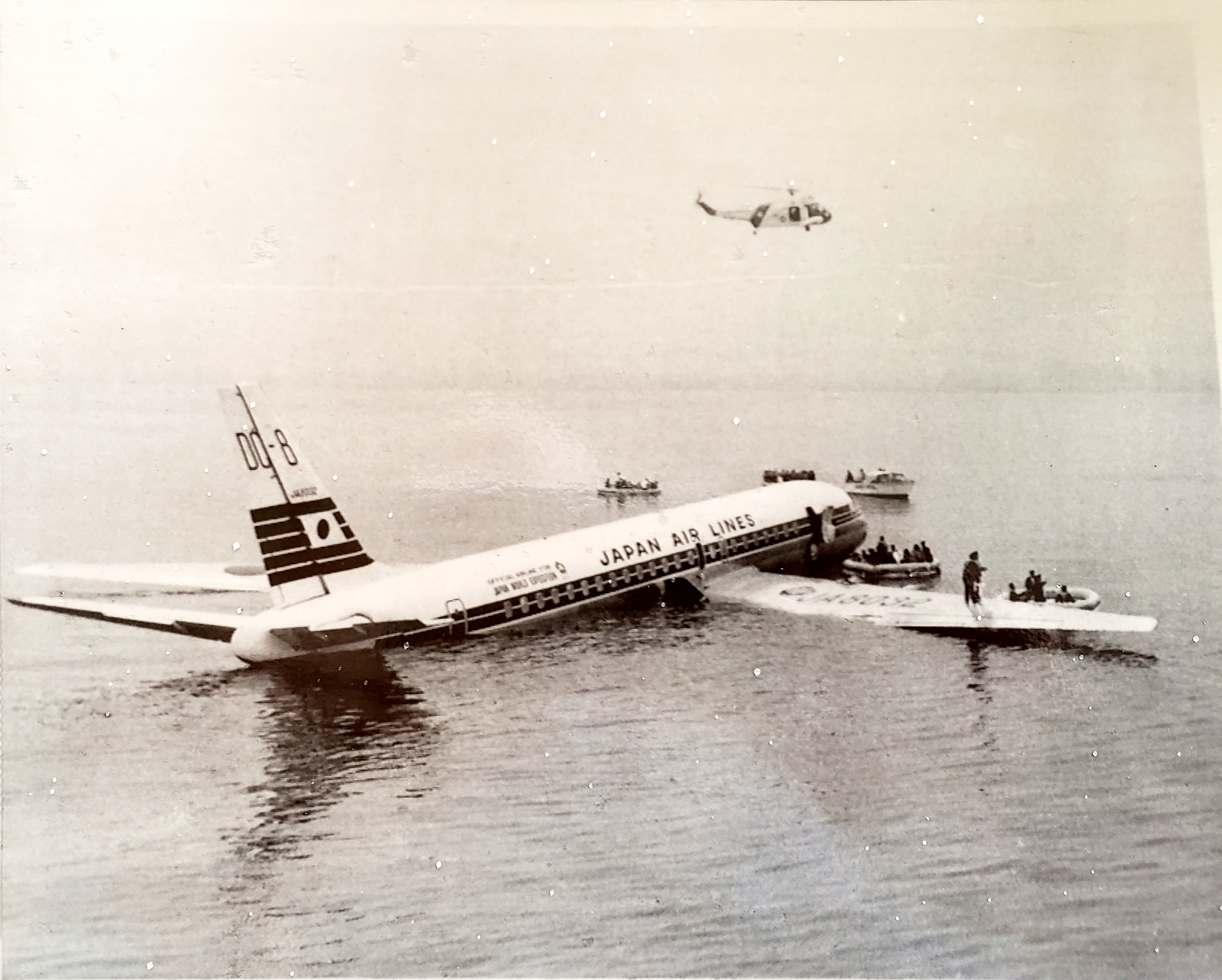
The aircraft was surprisingly intact after impact

Japan Air Lines Flight 2 was a regularly scheduled international passenger flight operating from Haneda Airport in Japan to San Francisco International Airport in the United States. On November 22, 1968, the aircraft operating the flight, a Douglas DC-8-62, accidentally ditched into San Francisco Bay. Miraculously, despite the suddenness of the impact, all 107 occupants on board survived with no injuries. The captain was faulted for failing to follow the official JAL procedures that describe how to perform an autopilot controlled descent.

== See also ==
- Ground Proximity Warning System
- Terrain Awareness And Warning System
- Boeing 747 hull losses
