= Controlled flight into terrain =

Type of aviation accident

A NTSB reconstruction of the final moments of Korean Air Flight 801, an example of CFIT

In aviation, a controlled flight into terrain (CFIT; usually /ˈsiːfɪt/ SEE-fit) is an accident in which an airworthy aircraft, fully under pilot control, is unintentionally flown into the ground, a body of water or other obstacle. In a typical CFIT scenario, the crew is unaware of the impending collision until impact, or it is too late to avert. The term was coined by engineers at Boeing in the late 1970s.

Accidents where the aircraft is out of control at the time of impact, because of mechanical failure or pilot error, are classified instead as uncontrolled flight into terrain, or UFIT. Incidents resulting from the deliberate action of the person at the controls, such as a forced landing, an act of terrorism, or suicide by pilot, are also excluded from the definition of CFIT.

According to Boeing in 1997, CFIT was a leading cause of airplane accidents involving the loss of life, causing over 9,000 deaths since the beginning of the commercial jet aircraft era. CFIT was identified as a cause of 25% of USAF Class A mishaps between 1993 and 2002. According to data collected by the International Air Transport Association (IATA) between 2008 and 2017, CFITs accounted for six percent of all commercial aircraft accidents, and was categorized as "the second-highest fatal accident category after Loss of Control Inflight (LOC-I)".

== Causes ==
While there are many reasons why an aircraft might crash into terrain, including poor weather and navigational equipment failure, pilot error is the most common factor found in CFIT accidents.

Behind such events there is often a loss of situational awareness by the pilot, who becomes unaware of their actual position and altitude in relation to the terrain below and immediately ahead of them. Fatigue can cause even highly experienced professionals to make significant errors, which culminate in a CFIT accident.

CFIT accidents frequently involve a collision with terrain such as hills or mountains or tall artificial obstacles such as radio towers during conditions of reduced visibility while approaching or departing from an airport. A contributing factor can be subtle navigation equipment malfunctions which, if not detected by the crew, may mislead them into improperly guiding the aircraft despite other information received from properly functioning equipment. CFIT is a constant hazard during aerial application, close air support, and aerial firefighting operations, which involve routine low-altitude flight along varying routes over terrain that may be unfamiliar to the pilots.

Rotorcraft are disproportionately affected by CFIT due to their frequent low-altitude operations; a review of helicopter accidents by the Vertical Aviation Safety Team found that approximately 24 percent involved CFIT, making it one of the leading accident categories in the rotary-wing sector.

== Solutions ==
Before the installation of the first electronic terrain warning systems, the only defenses against CFIT were conventional see-and-avoid aviation practices, pilot simulator training, crew resource management (CRM) and radar surveillance by air traffic services. While refinements applied to those practices helped reduce the incidence of CFIT accidents, they did not eliminate them.

To further assist in preventing CFIT accidents, manufacturers developed terrain awareness and warning systems (TAWS). The first generation of those systems was known as a ground proximity warning system (GPWS), which used a radar altimeter to assist in calculating terrain closure rates. That system was further improved with the addition of a GPS terrain database and is now known as an enhanced ground proximity warning system (EGPWS). When combined with mandatory pilot simulator training which emphasizes proper responses to any caution or warning event, the system has proved very effective in preventing further CFIT accidents.

Smaller aircraft often use a GPS database of terrain to provide terrain warning. The GPS database contains a database of nearby terrain and will present terrain that is near the aircraft in red or yellow depending on its distance from the aircraft.

The sterile flight deck rule was implemented to limit pilot distraction by banning any non-essential activities in the cockpit during critical phases of the flight, such as when operating at below 10,000 feet (3,000 m).

== See also ==
- Acronyms and abbreviations in avionics
- Aviation safety
- Minimum safe altitude warning (MSAW)
- Aviation obstruction lighting
- Suicide attack
- List of aviation accidents and incidents involving CFIT
