= 2025 Potomac River mid-air collision =

2025 mid-air collision over Washington, D.C.

2025 Potomac River mid-air collision American Airlines Flight 5342 · Priority Air Transport 25
- CCTV footage showing both aircraft at the moment of collision

Accident
- Date: January 29, 2025
- Summary: Mid-air collision due to FAA route design and oversight failures
- Site: Potomac River, Washington, D.C., U.S.; 38°50′33″N 77°1′29″W (Note: These coordinates correspond roughly to the position indicated in Figure 3 of the March 7, 2025, NTSB report. Geographic coordinates are presented here to only a precision of one second to avoid false precision.)
- Total fatalities: 67
- Total survivors: 0

First aircraft
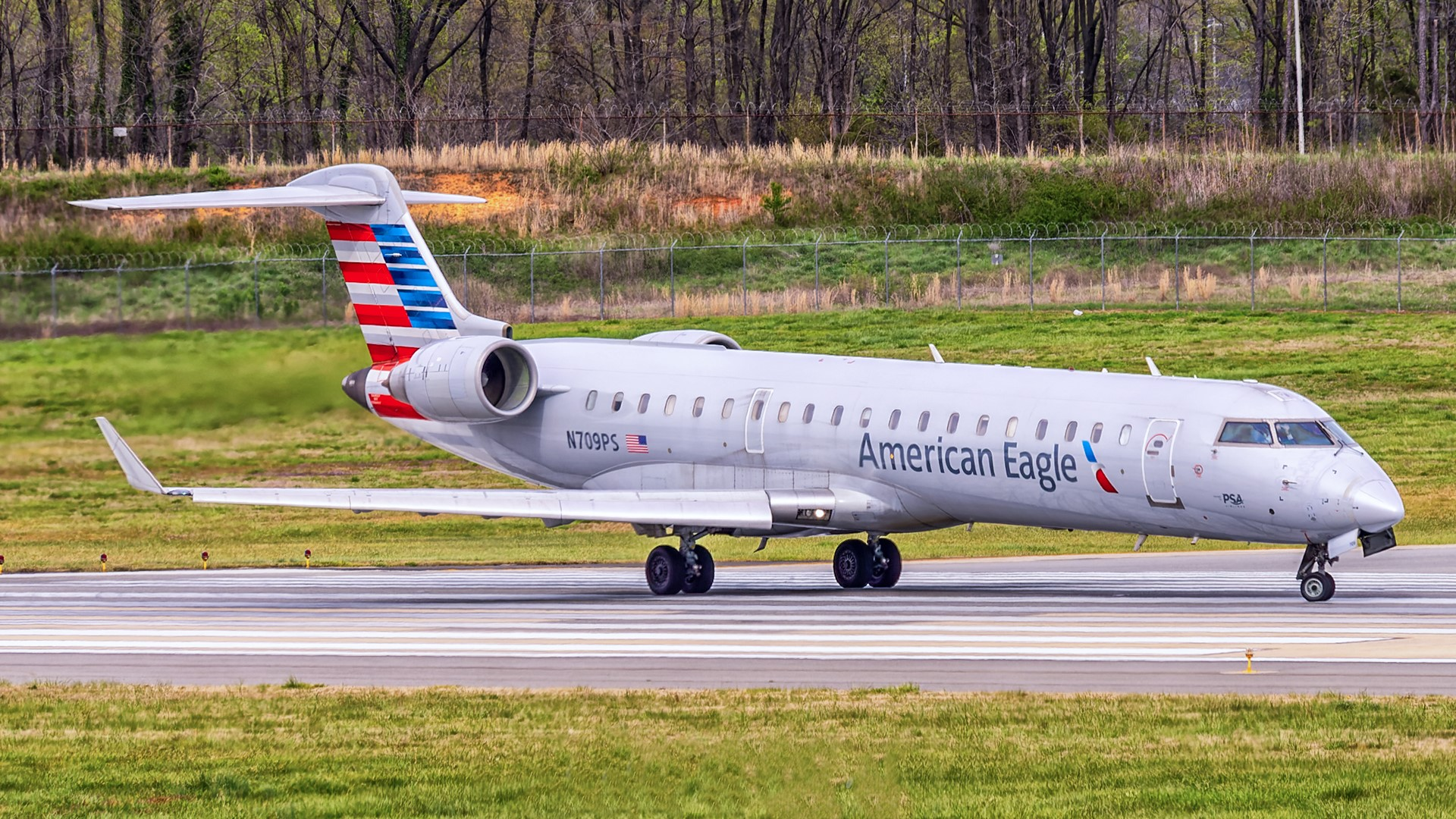
- N709PS, the Bombardier CRJ701ER involved in the collision, pictured in 2022
- Type: Bombardier CRJ701ER
- Operator: PSA Airlines on behalf of American Eagle (Note: American Eagle is a brand name used by American Airlines for regional airline flights it sells under codeshare agreements with five partner airlines including PSA Airlines. PSA Airlines is owned by the American Airlines Group, which is also the parent company of American Airlines.)
- IATA flight No.: OH5342/AA5342
- ICAO flight No.: JIA5342
- Call sign: BLUE STREAK 5342
- Registration: N709PS
- Flight origin: Wichita Dwight D. Eisenhower National Airport, Wichita, Kansas, US
- Destination: Ronald Reagan Washington National Airport, Arlington, Virginia, US
- Occupants: 64
- Passengers: 60
- Crew: 4
- Fatalities: 64
- Survivors: 0

Second aircraft
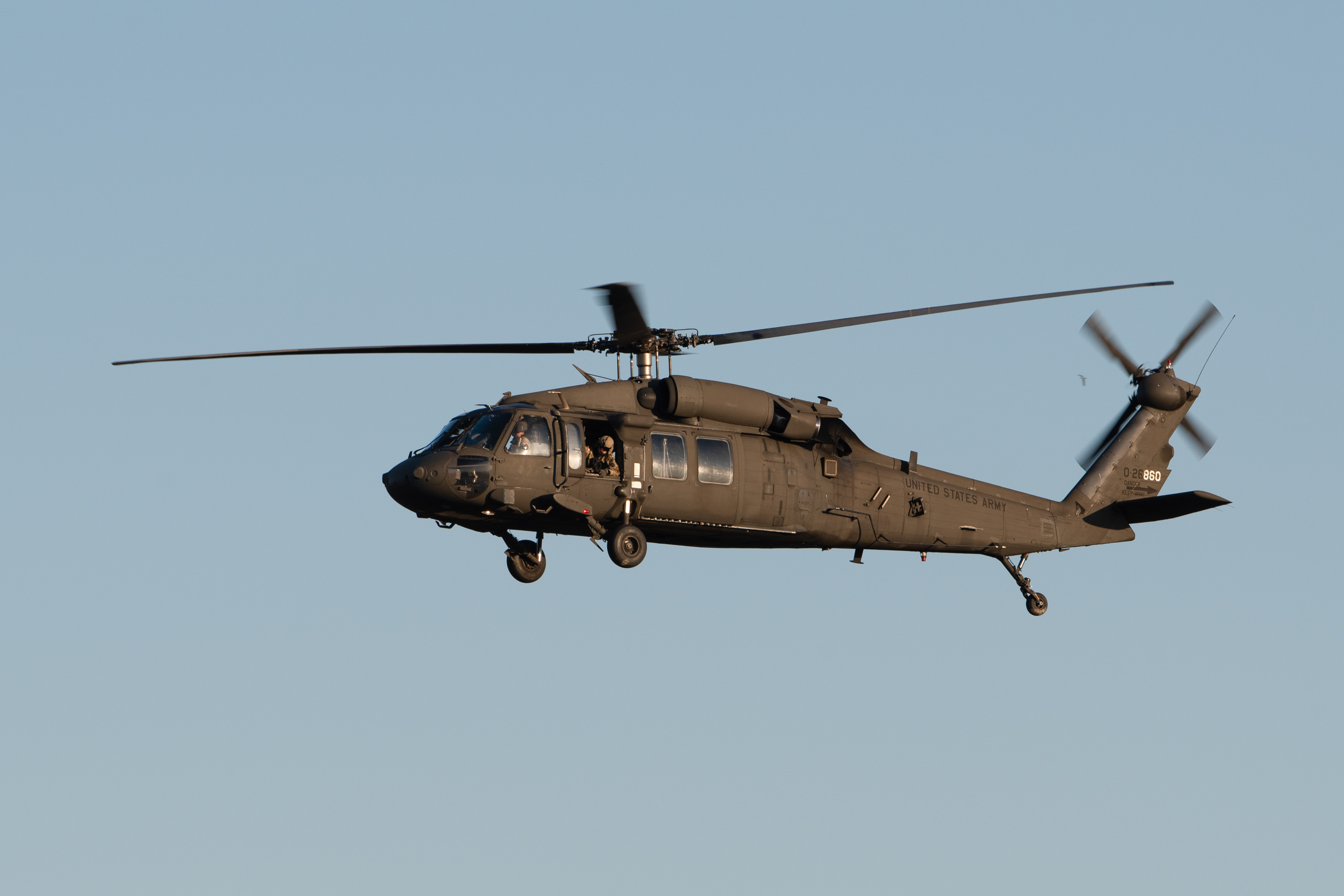
- 00-26860, the Sikorsky UH-60L Black Hawk involved in the collision, pictured in 2018 without the External Stores Support System it had equipped at the time of the accident
- Type: Sikorsky UH-60L Black Hawk
- Operator: 12th Aviation Battalion, United States Army
- Call sign: PAT25
- Registration: 00-26860
- Flight origin: Davison Army Airfield, Fort Belvoir, Virginia, US
- Destination: Davison Army Airfield, Fort Belvoir, Virginia, US
- Occupants: 3
- Crew: 3
- Fatalities: 3
- Survivors: 0

On January 29, 2025, a Bombardier CRJ700 airliner operating as American Airlines Flight 5342 (operated by PSA Airlines as American Eagle) and a United States Army Sikorsky UH-60 Black Hawk helicopter operating as Priority Air Transport 25 collided in mid-air over the Potomac River in Washington, D.C. The collision occurred at 8:47 p.m. at an altitude of about 300 feet (100 m) and about one-half mile (800 m) short of the threshold of runway 33 at Ronald Reagan Washington National Airport in Arlington, Virginia. All 67 people aboard both aircraft were killed in the crash, 64 passengers and crew on the airliner and the 3 crew of the helicopter. It was the first major US commercial passenger flight crash since Colgan Air Flight 3407 in 2009, and the deadliest US air disaster since the crash of American Airlines Flight 587 in 2001. This was also the third hull loss and first fatal accident involving the CRJ700 series.

The jet was on final approach into Reagan National Airport after flying a scheduled route from Wichita Dwight D. Eisenhower National Airport in Wichita, Kansas, to D.C., while the helicopter crew was performing a required annual flying evaluation with night vision goggles and had left from Davison Army Airfield in Fairfax County, Virginia. Both aircraft communicated with air traffic control before they collided. The helicopter crew reported twice that they had visual contact with the airliner and would maintain separation from it, although it is unknown whether they were monitoring the correct aircraft. The crew of the Black Hawk may not have heard parts of the tower communication due to a mic press.

On March 11, the National Transportation Safety Board (NTSB) released a preliminary report along with urgent safety recommendations, highlighting the dangerously narrow vertical separation between the runway approach path and the helicopter route. The NTSB chair also expressed anger that the Federal Aviation Administration (FAA) did not act on data showing the number of near-miss alerts over the previous decade.

The final report, released on February 17, 2026, concluded that the probable causes of the crash included the FAA's placement of the helicopter route, failures in the agency's oversight, and an overreliance on visual separation. Also causal was helicopter pilot error, loss of situational awareness by air traffic control due to high workload, and the United States Army's failure to ensure pilot understanding of altimeter error tolerances.

== Background ==
=== Aircraft ===
Flight 5342 was operated by a 20-year-old Bombardier CRJ700, a regional jet commonly used for short- to medium-haul flights. It was configured as a CRJ701ER, denoting extended range. Manufactured in September 2004, it bore the manufacturer's serial number 10165 and was registered as N709PS. PSA Airlines is owned by the American Airlines Group, which is also the parent company of American Airlines. No problems were reported as the plane took off from Wichita on its way to Washington. Flight 5342's route had been operated for about one year; previously, Kansas residents had needed to drive to adjacent Missouri and Oklahoma if they wanted to take direct flights to the East Coast. A year earlier, local leaders had finally convinced American Airlines to establish direct passenger air service from Kansas to the East Coast.

The helicopter involved was a US Army Sikorsky UH-60L Black Hawk with the serial number 00-26860. The helicopter was configured for use as executive transportation for senior US officials and soldiers, and was flying under the callsign PAT25 indicating a "Priority Air Transport" flight. No senior officials were on board the helicopter. The helicopter, of B Company of the 12th Aviation Battalion at Fort Belvoir, was on an annual and night vision goggles check flight out of Davison Army Airfield when the collision occurred. The helicopter was part of the Continuity of Government Plan, with the flight being a routine evaluation of aircrew in night flight along the corridor. In emergencies, elements of the US government would use it to evacuate the capital.

=== Passengers and crew ===
The airliner carried 60 passengers and four crew members: a captain, a first officer and two flight attendants:

- Captain Jonathan Campos, 34, was the pilot flying and had been with the airline for six years. He had logged 3,950 flight hours, including 3,024 on CRJ-series aircraft, and was a Federal Flight Deck Officer.
- First Officer Samuel Lilley, 28, was the pilot monitoring. He had worked for the airline for two years and accumulated 2,469 flight hours, with 966 on the CRJ.

The helicopter had a crew of three Army personnel:

- Captain Rebecca Lobach, 28, was the pilot flying and undergoing her annual night flying evaluation. She had accumulated 450 flight hours at the time of the crash, with 326 on UH-60 type helicopters.
- Chief Warrant Officer 2 Andrew Eaves, 39, was the evaluator for Lobach and was serving as the pilot monitoring who primarily communicated with air traffic controllers. He had 968 flight hours, with 886 on the UH-60.
- Staff Sergeant Ryan O'Hara, 29, was the crew chief (aircraft maintenance technician), with 1,149 flight hours, all being on the UH-60.

=== Ronald Reagan Washington National Airport ===
The airspace around Reagan National Airport is among the world's most complex and closely monitored, with restrictions on both sides of the Potomac River to protect government buildings in Washington, D.C. Efforts have been made to reduce congestion, but in 2024, Congress approved additional flights. Military helicopter operations further complicated the airspace, including a helicopter corridor which passes within 15 feet (4.6 m) vertically of the approach to runway 33.

Reagan National has three runways: 1/19, 15/33, and 4/22. Runways 1/19 handle 95% of commercial aircraft arrivals. Runway 33 handles about 4%, and runway 15—due to its close proximity to the Pentagon—handles fewer than 1%. Runways 4/22 are rarely used for commercial aircraft, mainly smaller aircraft on short routes to the Northeast. During north operations, which were in effect at the time of the collision, most arrivals occur on runway 1, with intermittent arrivals on runway 33, depending on traffic demands and separation requirements. The use of runway 33 is typically limited to smaller aircraft, which are able to land on its relatively short 5,204-foot-long (1,586 m) surface.

The New York Times reported that as of September 2023, the tower at Reagan Airport was nearly a third below targeted staffing levels. The staffing shortage has forced many controllers to work up to six days a week and 10 hours daily.

On the night of the collision, air traffic control (ATC) staffing was below the typical level for that time and traffic volume, according to a preliminary Federal Aviation Administration (FAA) safety report. Normally, the tower had six controllers: assistant local control, ground control, clearance delivery, local control, and an operations supervisor.

At 9:30 p.m., when air traffic usually decreases, the helicopter control and local control positions are typically combined. However, on the day of the collision, the supervisor merged those positions at 3:40 p.m. allowing one controller to leave early. The air traffic controllers' union cautioned against assuming that the combined role would make conditions unsafe.

Helicopter control and local control operate on different radio frequencies, meaning the crews of Flight 5342 and PAT25 were not able to hear each other's transmissions to the controller, but both could hear the controller's responses.

== Accident ==
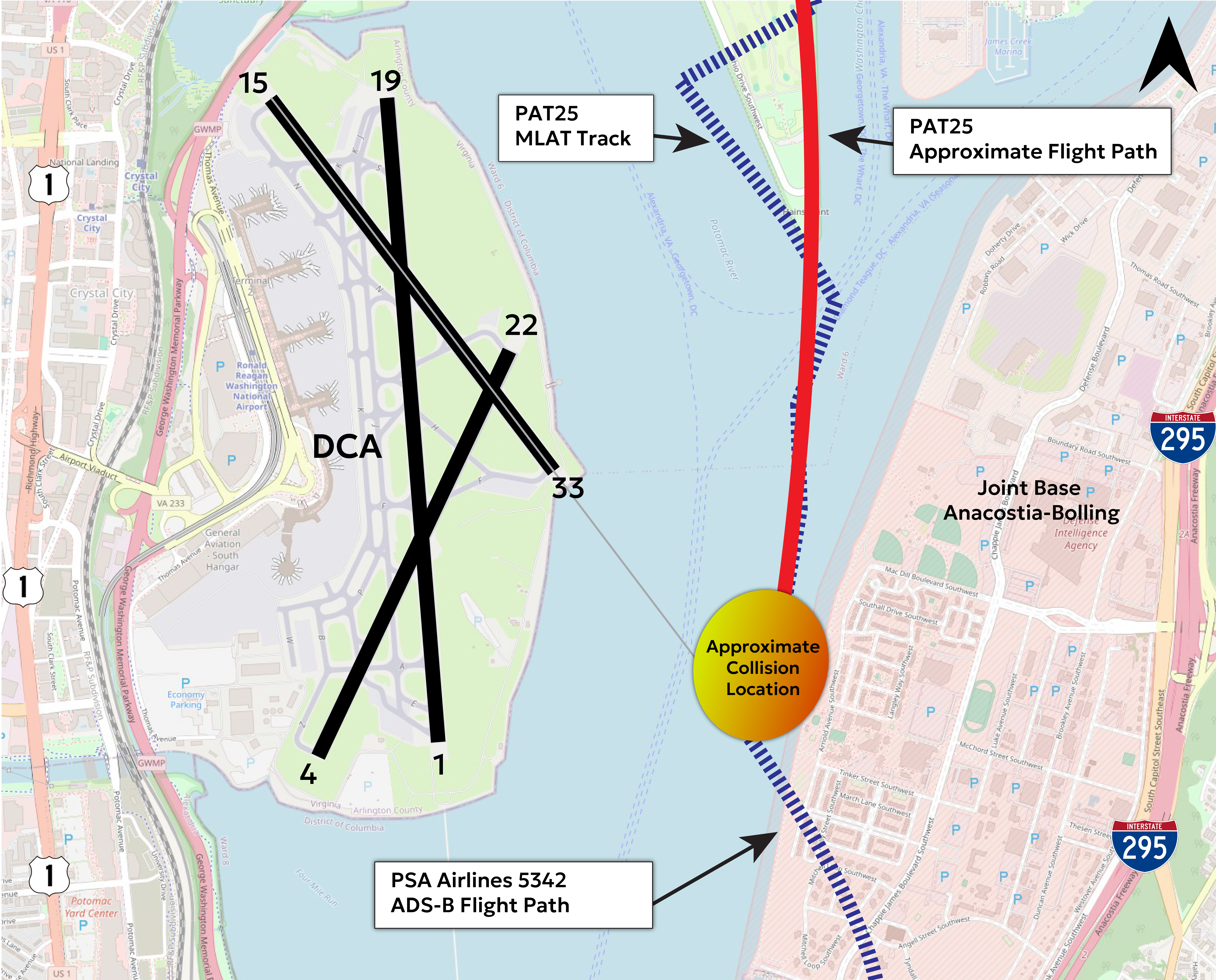
Map of the flight paths of the helicopter and regional jet, with an approximate location of the collision

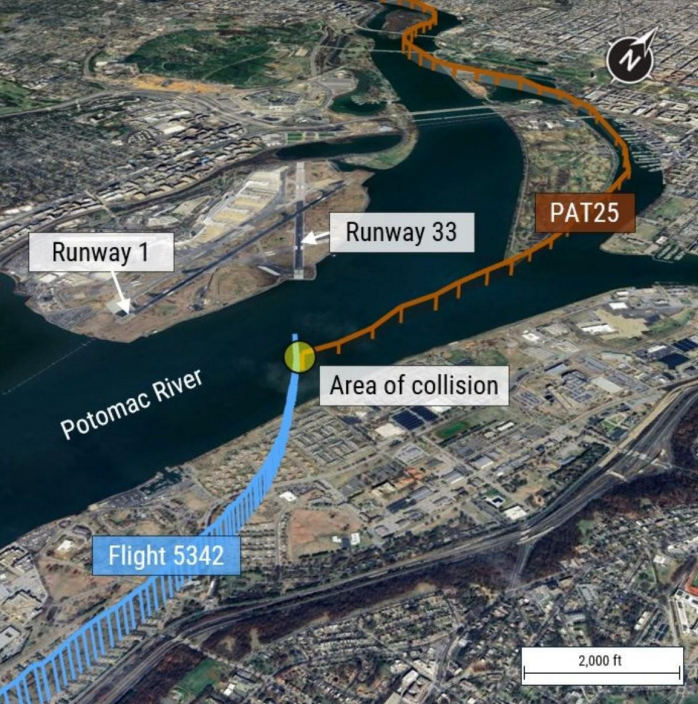
NTSB graphic of the flight paths

At 8:43 p.m. EST (2025-01-30T01:43 UTC), as American Airlines Flight 5342 was flying a visual approach to runway 1, it made initial contact with the Reagan National control tower. The controller asked if the crew could switch to runway 33. The crew accepted the request and were subsequently cleared to land on runway 33. The helicopter was about 1.1 nautical miles (2.0 km; 1.3 mi) west of the Key Bridge following Helicopter Route 1 to Helicopter Route 4. At 8:46 p.m., around two minutes before the collision, the controller called the helicopter crew, advising them of a CRJ700, at an altitude of 1,200 feet (370 m) south of the Woodrow Wilson Memorial Bridge, circling runway 33. The part of the transmission advising that the CRJ was "circling" was not captured by the helicopter's cockpit voice recorder (CVR) and may not have been heard by the helicopter crew. The helicopter crew acknowledged that they had the jet in sight and requested visual separation—meaning that they could see and maintain separation from the aircraft on their own—which the controller approved. However, it remains unclear if they had acknowledged the correct aircraft.

At 8:47 p.m. EST, 20 seconds before the collision, the controller asked the helicopter crew if they had the CRJ in sight. An audible air traffic radar conflict alert in the background of the transmission was present. One second later, the airliner crew received an automatic traffic advisory from their traffic collision avoidance system (TCAS) which was accompanied by an audible announcement in the cockpit, "traffic; traffic." However, TCAS resolution advisories with audible instructions like "climb; climb" or "descend; descend" are automatically disabled when an aircraft is below 900 feet (270 m) above ground level to avoid guiding an aircraft into potential collisions with terrain or other aircraft in congested terminal airspace. TCAS traffic advisories are disabled below 400 feet (120 m).

Seventeen seconds before the collision, the controller instructed the helicopter to pass behind Flight 5342. One of the helicopter crew members depressed a mic for 0.8 seconds to communicate with the controller during this transmission, which may have caused the "pass behind" part of the transmission to be missed by the helicopter crew. The helicopter crew again confirmed they had an airplane in sight and requested visual separation from the airliner, which the controller approved again.

Fifteen seconds before the crash, flight instructor and co-pilot Chief Warrant Officer 2 Andrew Loyd Eaves asked the pilot, Capt. Rebecca M. Lobach, to change course by making a sharp left to the east river bank. Capt. Lobach acknowledged the request and attempted to execute it, but failed. Seven seconds before the collision, the airliner "rolled out on final" (finished its turn) to line up with runway 33. One second before the crash, the airliner increased its pitch with its elevators deflected close to their maximum nose-up travel.

Security camera footage from one of the airport terminals shows the collision

EarthCam footage of the collision taken from the Kennedy Center, looking southeast

The two aircraft collided at 8:47:59. The recorded radio altitude of the Black Hawk at the time of the collision was 278 feet (85 m). The helicopter's tail rotor struck the CRJ's lower-right aft fuselage and the main rotor blades sliced through part of the airliner's left wing, which subsequently separated. The helicopter exploded and both aircraft crashed into the Potomac River. The airliner's airspeed was 128 miles per hour (206 km/h; 111 kn). The CRJ700's radio transponder ceased transmitting about 2,400 feet (730 m) short of Runway 33.

The collision was captured by a webcam at the John F. Kennedy Center for the Performing Arts, and another video showed a brief trail of fire. Other videos showed the collision had damaged the rotor blades of the Black Hawk and the left wing of the CRJ700, which separated from the airliner and caused it to fall in a left-hand spiral into the water. Witnesses reported that the airliner "split in half" upon impact, while the helicopter crashed upside down near the airliner. A pilot in another aircraft confirmed seeing the crash to an air traffic controller and reported seeing flares from the opposite side of the Potomac as his flight was on short final.

Within three hours of the collision, authorities confirmed fatalities. By 2:50 a.m. the following morning, no survivors had been reported, and the search and rescue operations were described as "becoming more grim". By the afternoon, all 67 people on board both aircraft were presumed dead.

It was the first major commercial passenger flight accident in the US in nearly 16 years, following Colgan Air Flight 3407 in February 2009. It was also the first fatal crash involving American Airlines since Flight 587 in November 2001, as well as the first fatal crash of a CRJ700 series aircraft. It was the first crash in the Potomac River since Air Florida Flight 90 in January 1982.

=== Emergency response ===
National Transportation Safety Board drone footage, with Reagan National Airport's runway 33 in the background

Chief John Donnelly of the District of Columbia Fire and Emergency Medical Services Department (DC FEMS) said emergency responders were notified of an aircraft crash at 8:48 p.m. The first units arrived at the scene at 8:58 p.m., where they discovered the aircraft in the water. DC FEMS was joined by emergency personnel from the Metropolitan Police Department of the District of Columbia, Metropolitan Washington Airports Authority Fire and Rescue Department, United States Coast Guard, Maryland State Police, along with other local, state, and federal agencies. Additionally, several Hornblower Cruises tour boats sailed from the Washington Sailing Marina in Alexandria, Virginia to help with search and rescue operations.

Fireboats and divers were deployed to search for victims and survivors; cold temperatures, strong winds, ice, and murky water hampered rescue efforts. The water temperature near the crash site was recorded at 35 °F (2 °C). On January 30, the rescue operation turned into a recovery mission. By February 4, all bodies had been recovered, including the three soldiers in the helicopter, and all of them were identified by February 5. After the collision, Reagan National Airport suspended all takeoffs and landings, diverting flights to nearby airports, including Dulles, Baltimore/Washington, and Richmond. The Washington Metropolitan Area Transit Authority extended Silver Line service to help passengers whose flights were diverted to Dulles and dispatched "warming buses" to help relief operations. The airport remained closed for over fourteen hours, until 11:00 a.m. on January 30.

The fuselage of Flight 5342 was found upside down in three sections in the river and was recovered. The search for debris was extended to the Woodrow Wilson Bridge, three miles (5 km) south of the airport. A crane used to lift debris after the March 2024 collapse of the Francis Scott Key Bridge in Baltimore was brought to help pick up plane wreckage, and the US Navy also sent two barges to recover heavy items. According to federal officials, the wreckage of the helicopter was also recovered and was transported to a secure location.

== Casualties ==
=== Figure skating community ===
Among the passengers on the jet were 28 U.S. Figure Skating athletes, coaches, and family members returning from a national development camp held in conjunction with the 2025 U.S. Figure Skating Championships in Wichita, Kansas. This included eleven skaters, all between the ages of 11 and 16, as well as thirteen accompanying parents and four coaches.

Due to the low number of any other direct passenger flights between Wichita and the East Coast, Flight 5342 was the most direct route home for many visitors from the Northeast. Most of the athlete victims were too young to be viable candidates for the 2026 Winter Olympics but would have been eligible for the 2030 Winter Olympics.

The four coaches killed were all former Soviet/Russian figure skaters. This included married couple Evgenia Shishkova and Vadim Naumov, who had won gold medals in pair skating at the 1994 World Figure Skating Championships, as well as Inna Volyanskaya and Alexandr Kirsanov, who had competed in pairs and ice dance, respectively.

On March 2, 2025, Maxim Naumov, the son of Shishkova and Naumov, performed alongside other notable figure skaters and family members of victims at Legacy on Ice, a two-hour tribute show held at Washington, D.C.'s Capital One Arena in honor of the victims of the collision. The impact of the crash on U.S. Figure Skating is similar to that of Sabena Flight 548, which killed the entire 1961 U.S. Figure Skating team, most of whom were from the Skating Club of Boston. The Skating Club of Boston lost six club members in the crash of Flight 5342.

=== Other deaths ===
Other passengers included five French nationals, two Chinese nationals, a Philippine national, two Polish citizens, and a Danish citizen.

== Aftermath ==
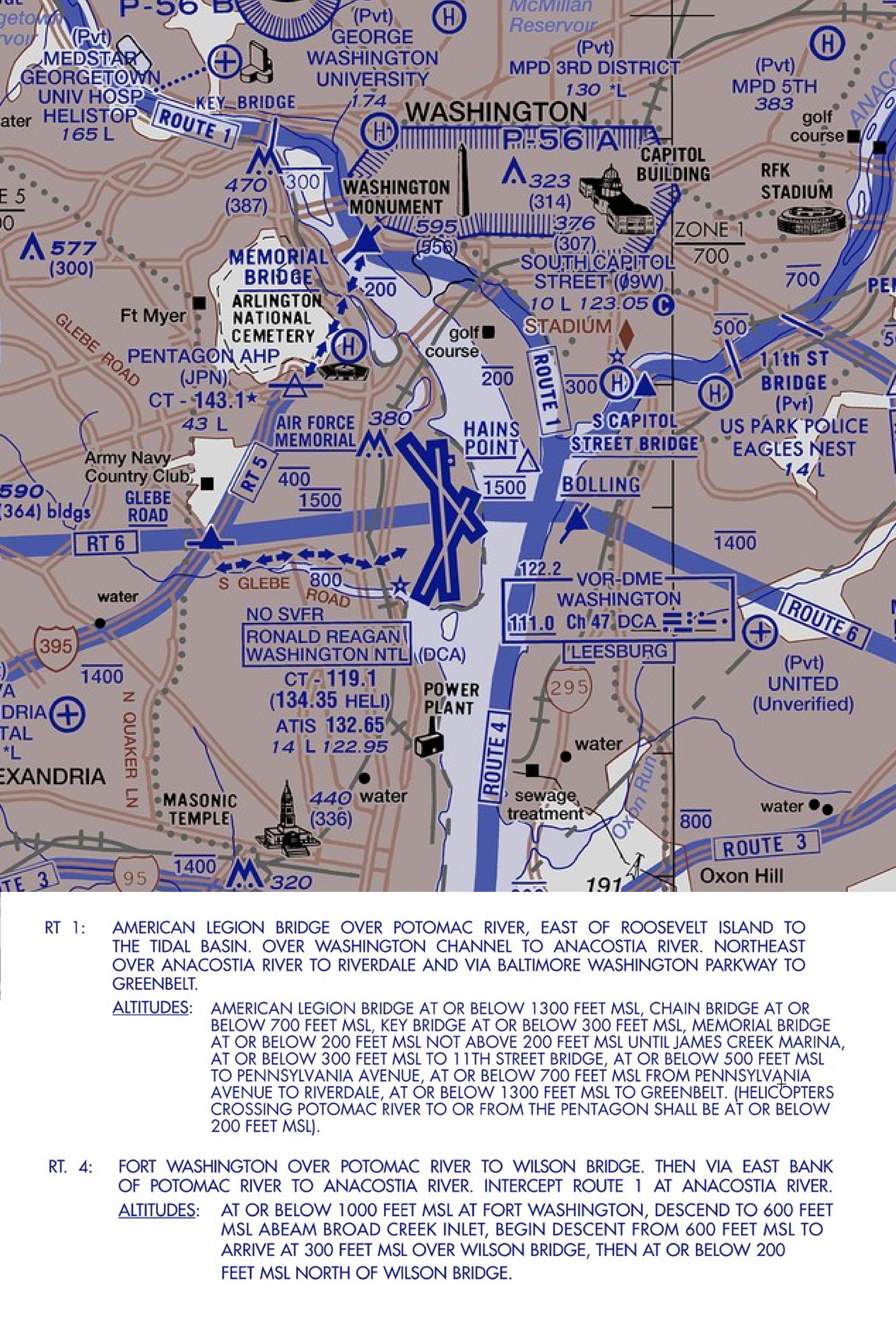
FAA chart showing the helicopter routes near Reagan National. Routes 1 and 4 can be seen over the upper and lower Potomac River respectively.

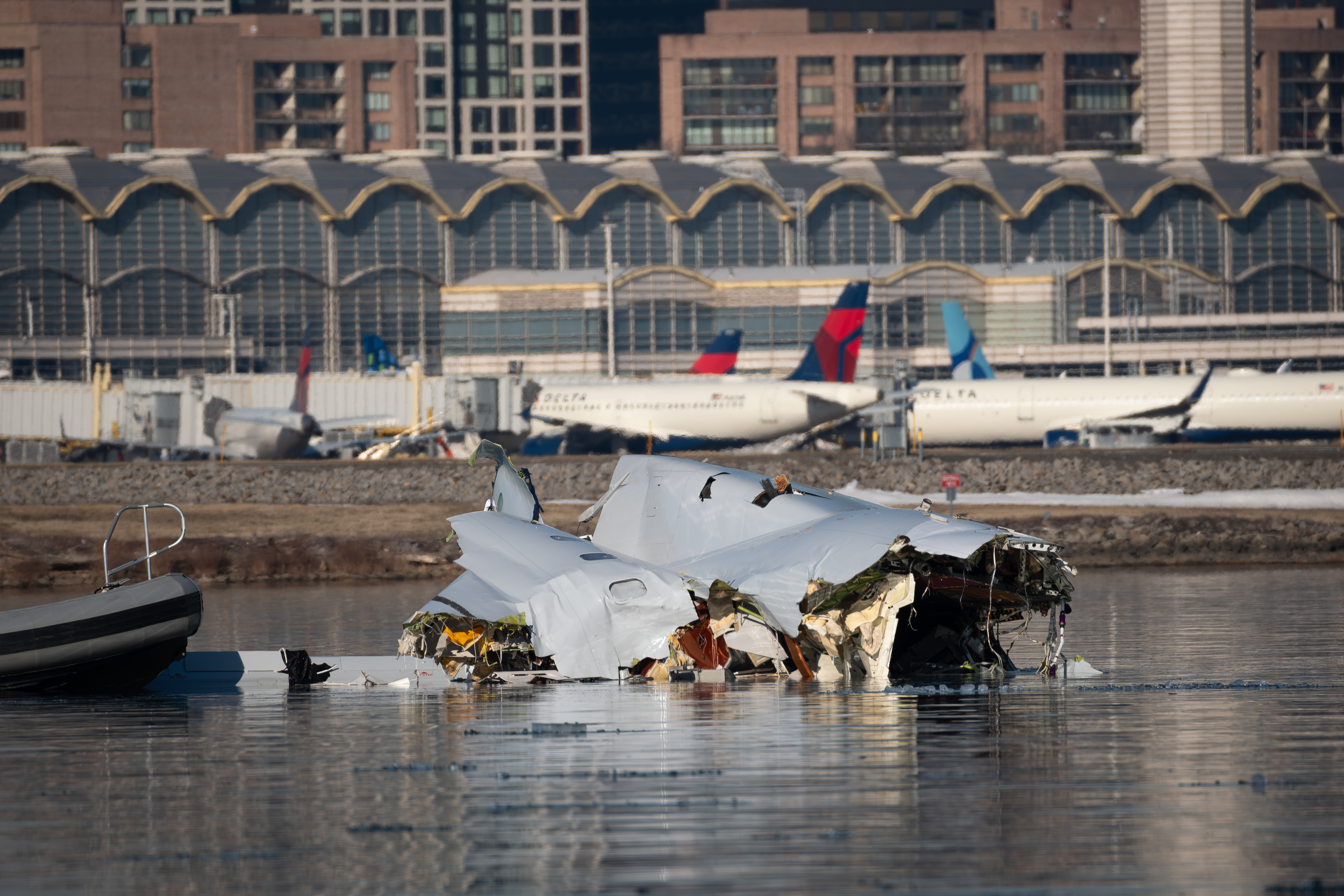
Wreckage of the PSA plane the morning after the crash

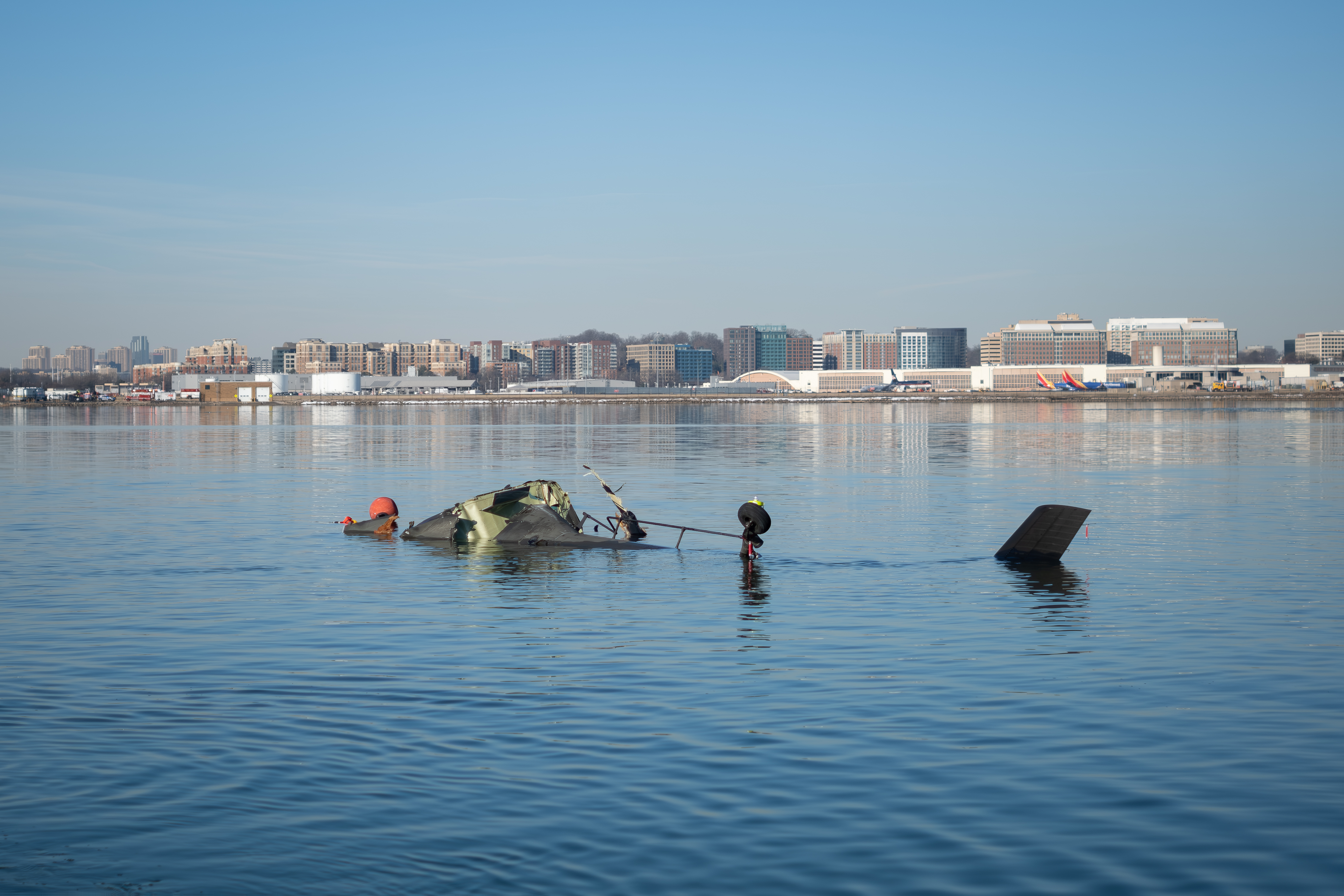
Helicopter wreckage after the crash

On January 31, 2025, the FAA restricted helicopter flights near the airport. The FAA partially closed both the route that the Black Hawk was on when it collided with the CRJ700 and another route that runs south of the Key Bridge in Washington and connects the neighborhood of Georgetown to Rosslyn, Virginia. These routes, designated Route 4 and Route 1 respectively, remain open only to police, medical, air defense, and presidential transport flights. On the same day, American Airlines retired flight number 5342 and said that the new number for the Wichita to Washington National route would be Flight 5677.

Separately, two staff members of the Metropolitan Washington Airports Authority were taken into custody on suspicion of providing CNN with surveillance footage of the crash.

A vigil was held at the Wichita City Council chambers in memory of the victims. The loss of so many athletes was devastating for Wichita, which had fought to raise its prominence by improving passenger air service and seeking to host major sporting events.

A "memorial bench" was built in Alexandria on the side of the Potomac River near to where the two aircraft crashed, which is inscribed with the words "May the 67 lives lost over these waters on January 29, 2025 be forever remembered."

== Investigation ==
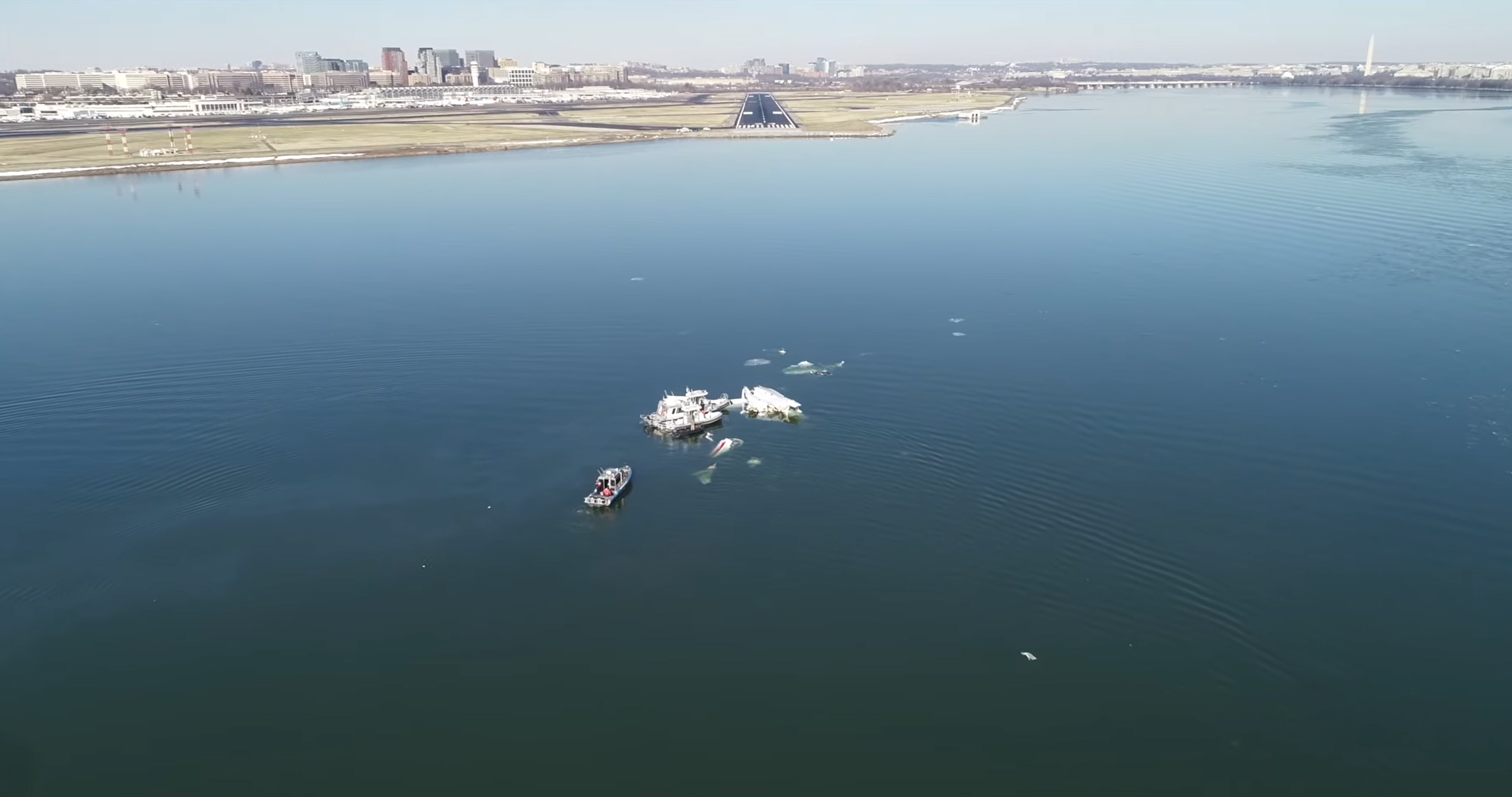
Remains of the wreckage with the skyline in the background

The National Transportation Safety Board (NTSB), the FAA, the US Department of Defense, and the US Army announced they would launch investigations into the collision. The NTSB prepared an investigation team to send to the accident site. To retain needed personnel after the crash, the agency acquired an exemption from the "Fork in the Road" memo which purported to allow all of its agents to quit with severance paid through September 2025. The Federal Bureau of Investigation (FBI) also stated it would help with the response. However, there were no indications of terrorism or criminal activity. The Transportation Safety Board of Canada (TSB) deployed two investigators to help the investigation, since the Bombardier CRJ700 was designed and manufactured in Canada.

On the evening of January 30, the flight recorder ("black box") of Flight 5342 was recovered from the wreckage and brought to the NTSB lab for evaluation. The helicopter's flight recorder was recovered on January 31.

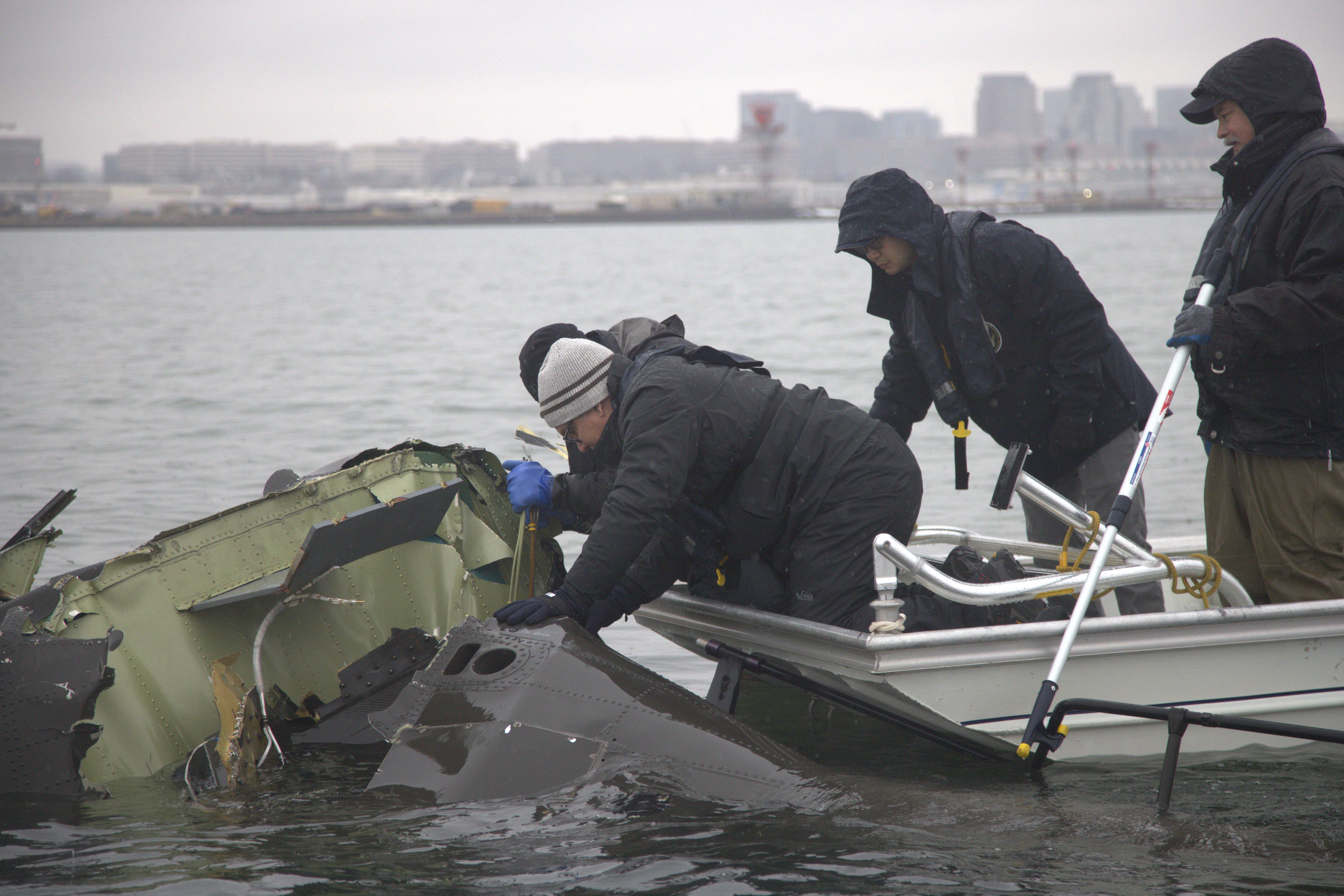
NTSB investigators recovering pieces of wreckage from the Potomac River on February 2

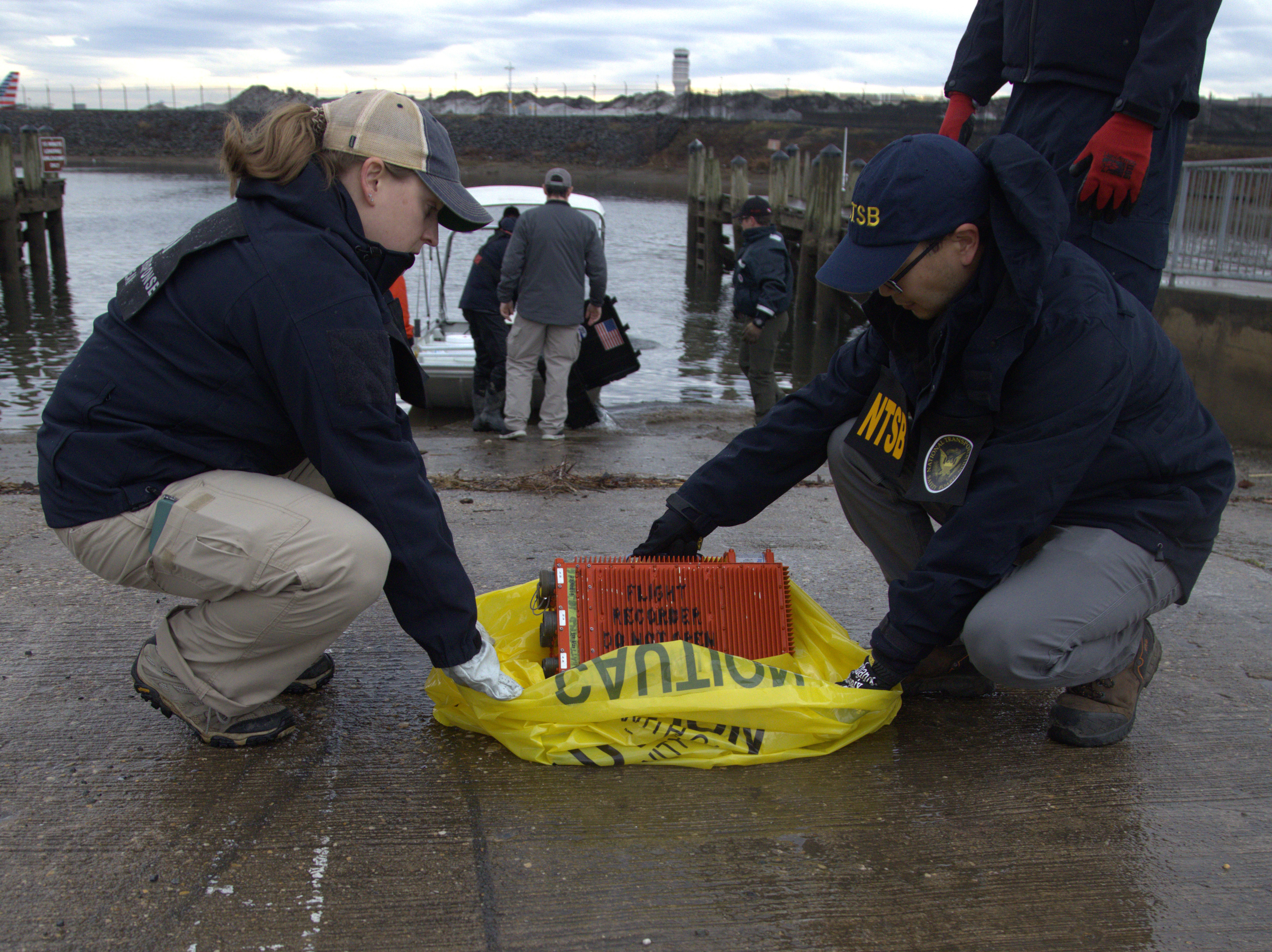
Flight recorder of the UH-60 Black Hawk helicopter recovered by the NTSB from the Potomac River on February 2

According to the NTSB, at the moment of impact, the helicopter was at a radio altitude of 278 feet (85 m). Reagan National requires helicopters on that route to stay at or below 200 feet (61 m) above mean sea level. The altitude that the barometric altimeter displayed to the helicopter crew was not recorded by the flight recorder. Investigators would normally calculate the barometric altitude displayed to the crew using pressure altitude recorded by the flight recorder, but investigators determined that the data was not valid.

Senators Ted Cruz and Tammy Duckworth addressed questions about the automatic dependent surveillance-broadcast system (ADS-B) which was reportedly turned off on the Black Hawk. Some flight data was being sent from the aircraft but the safety system sends what is considered the most-accurate data. The NTSB confirmed ADS-B was not broadcasting from the helicopter and said they would investigate if there was an equipment malfunction or it was turned off.

A single air traffic controller was managing both aircraft at the time of the crash, an arrangement deemed "not normal" for that time of day at the airport. According to the helicopter's cockpit voice and data recorder, the helicopter crew may have missed parts of two transmissions made by the air traffic controller regarding the jet. Two minutes before the collision, the part of the transmission which said that the plane was "circling" to runway 33 was not heard on the recording. Seventeen seconds before the crash, the part of the transmission stating "pass behind the" was interrupted by the helicopter crew keying their mic to communicate with the air traffic controller.

About nineteen seconds before impact, the crew of Flight 5342 received an automated traffic advisory alert from the TCAS system. Data from the flight recorder showed the PSA jet pitched up about one second before impact, but investigators did not say whether this was an attempted evasive maneuver by the PSA pilots.

=== NTSB preliminary report and recommendations ===
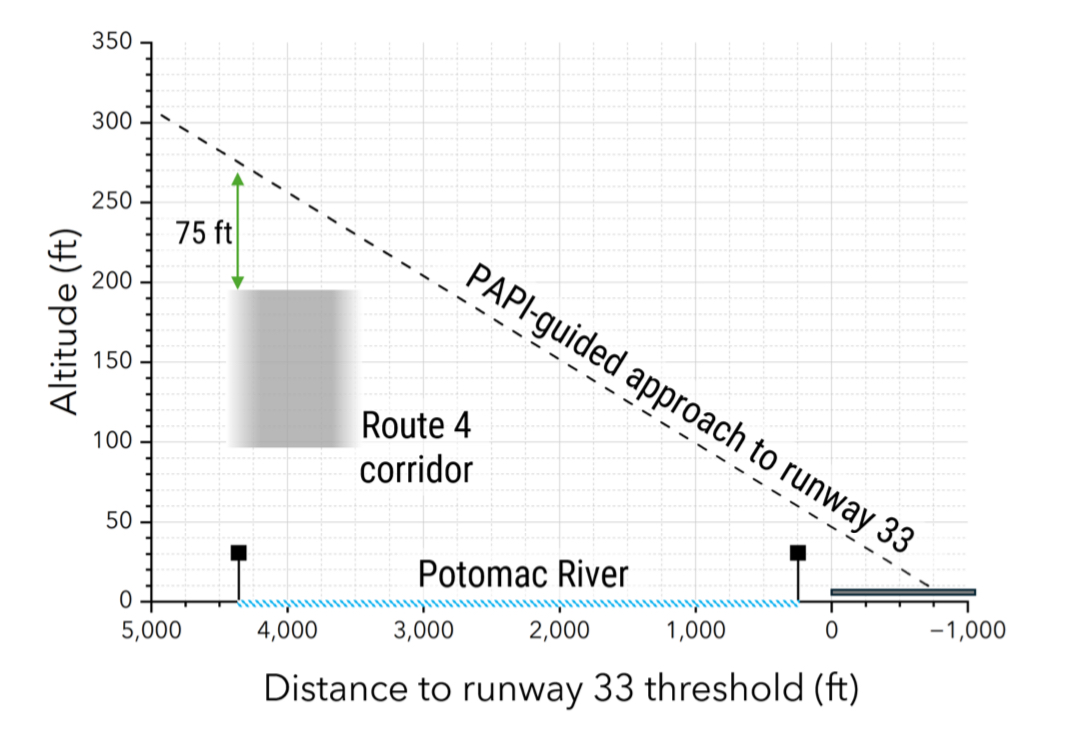
NTSB diagram showing proximity between the two routes

The NTSB released a preliminary report on March 11, 2025, accompanied by two urgent safety recommendations to the FAA regarding flight traffic decongestion. Investigators reviewed years of encounters between helicopters and commercial aircraft near Reagan National Airport, finding that "at least one traffic collision avoidance system (TCAS) resolution advisory was triggered per month" since 2011.

Helicopters flying within the route 4 corridor, which is designated for operations "at or below 200 feet (61 m)," would have only 75 feet (23 m) of vertical separation from a plane landing on runway 33 if flying directly over the eastern shoreline of the Potomac River. Since route 4 lacks lateral boundaries or instructions to operate a defined distance from the shoreline, this already minimal separation decreases further when a helicopter operates farther from the shore. This vertical separation also decreases if an airplane is operating below the 3° visual glidepath provided by runway 33's precision approach path indicator (PAPI). The board concluded that the proximity of route 4 to runway 33's approach path posed "an intolerable risk to aviation safety."

The NTSB urgently recommended that the FAA close route 4 near the airport during runway 33 landings or opposite-direction takeoffs and designate an alternate helicopter route during those times. NTSB Chair Jennifer Homendy expressed anger that the FAA had not used the same near-miss data her investigators relied on to identify the risk and examine the helicopter routes before the crash occurred and said, "It does make me angry, but it also makes me feel incredibly devastated for families that are grieving." The near-miss data from October 2021 to December 2024 highlighted 15,214 close-proximity events between helicopters and commercial planes, including 85 incidents that were dangerously separated less than 1,500 feet horizontally and 200 feet vertically.

=== Findings and recommendations ===
The NTSB held a three-day investigative hearing from July 30 to August 1, 2025, and a public meeting on this investigation on January 27, 2026. It published 74 findings and 50 recommendations to prevent similar accidents in the future.

The probable cause of the accident, according to the NTSB, was the placement of a helicopter route in close proximity to a runway approach path by the Federal Aviation Administration's (FAA). The FAA did not regularly evaluate route safety data and did not implement recommendations proposed to reduce risk of midair collision near Ronald Reagan Washington National Airport. Also, the air traffic system was overreliant on visual separation for efficiency, discarding the inherent limitations of this "see-and-avoid" concept, and the helicopter crew did not apply visual separation, causing the collision.

Significant additional factors included:

- Air traffic control tower team's loss of situation awareness and degraded performance due to the high workload of the combined helicopter and local control positions. The absence of a risk assessment process to identify and mitigate real-time operational risk factors, which resulted in misprioritization of duties, inadequate traffic advisories, and the lack of safety alerts to both flight crews;
- The failure of the US Army to ensure pilots' awareness of the effects of error tolerances on barometric altimeters in their helicopters, which resulted in the crew flying above the maximum published helicopter route altitude.

== Lawsuit ==
On February 18, 2025, on behalf of one of the victims of Flight 5342, attorney Robert A. Clifford filed a $250 million tort complaint against the Federal Aviation Administration and the US Army under the Federal Tort Claims Act under Form 95. The government had six months to respond and act on the claim; if the government allowed the deadline to expire, the plaintiff would have the right to sue in federal district court. Attorney Clifford sued on September 24 in federal court in D.C., alleging criminal negligence. Defendants were PSA Airlines, American Airlines, the US Army, and the federal government. At a press conference, Clifford said passenger Casey Crafton died as a result of systematic failings and a careless disregard for safety. More families were added to the Clifford case. Clifford partnered with the Kreindler & Kreindler law firm in New York City. The US Army said it would not comment. American Airlines denied responsibility. On December 17, the government admitted in a court filing in response to the lawsuit that it was partially at fault for the crash and that it owed and had breached its duty of care to the plaintiffs. The filing said that an air traffic controller did not follow the proper procedure for visual separation and that the helicopter pilots failed to remain vigilant. The airline has filed motions to dismiss the claims against them.

On July 30, attorney Robert Curtis filed another federal tort complaint for $200 million on behalf of another victim of Flight 5342, setting a separate six-month deadline for the government to respond.

"We are not going to litigate this case in the press", Judge Reyes warned, adding that while defendants may make public remarks when submitting their answers, they must abstain from further debate. Robert's comment was revealed after the federal government acknowledged some culpability, which infuriated Reyes, who warned that future disobedience of court orders could result in consequences. The complaints are consolidated before Reyes, and on February 27, there will be a hearing on petitions to dismiss; by that time, the judge will have declined American Airlines's request to dismiss from this lawsuit. American Airlines contends that the plaintiff attorneys have not shown that they have broken any federal rules or regulations.

Another lawsuit was filed against the federal government and American Airlines from the Jacksonville-based Spohrer Dodd law firm on behalf of another victim, and they said 60 lawsuits were filed in federal courts.

== Responses ==
=== Aviation ===
American Airlines CEO Robert Isom, in a video statement produced by the airline, expressed that he was "absolutely heartbroken". He went on to state that AA "[didn't] know why the military aircraft came into the path" but that he pledged full cooperation with federal investigators. American Airlines also activated a "care team" for family members of passengers on Flight 5342, including a hotline allowing families to find out if their family members were on board.

Chesley "Sully" Sullenberger, an aviation safety expert and the pilot of US Airways Flight 1549 that ditched in the Hudson River in 2009, argued for more safety zones and restrictions on flight patterns.

=== Domestic ===
President Donald Trump was briefed within an hour after the 8:47pm collision. Shortly after midnight, he wrote on Truth Social questioning the actions of the air traffic controllers and asserting that the situation could have been prevented. He also criticized the helicopter crew for flying too high. Later that morning, Trump released a statement calling the crash a "terrible accident," thanking emergency responders and saying of the victims: "May God bless their souls."

Trump falsely alleged that the FAA's diversity, equity, and inclusion (DEI) goals supported by former presidents Joe Biden and Barack Obama may have been partly to blame for the crash by stating "they actually came out with a directive, too White." Thrown into the light was a policy introduced in 2013 by the Obama administration's FAA that encouraged the hiring of minorities as air traffic controllers. This policy was continued by the first Trump administration's FAA. He harshly criticized former transportation secretary Pete Buttigieg, accusing him of prioritizing diversity in the FAA.

Trump criticized the FAA for targeting disabilities such as "hearing, vision, missing extremities, partial or complete paralysis, epilepsy, severe intellectual disability, psychiatric disability and dwarfism" for special emphasis in recruitment and hiring. This was a policy introduced in 2019 by his own first administration's FAA, which announced a program to allow 20 people with "targeted disabilities" to train at air traffic control centers for air traffic operations careers. Several disabilities such as epilepsy, poor vision, and some mental disorders were still disqualifying for air traffic controller positions per FAA and OPM regulations.

Trump said that he would meet with families of the victims, but rebuffed the idea of visiting the site of the accident after being pressed by reporters during a briefing, asking, "What's the site? The water? You want me to go swimming?"

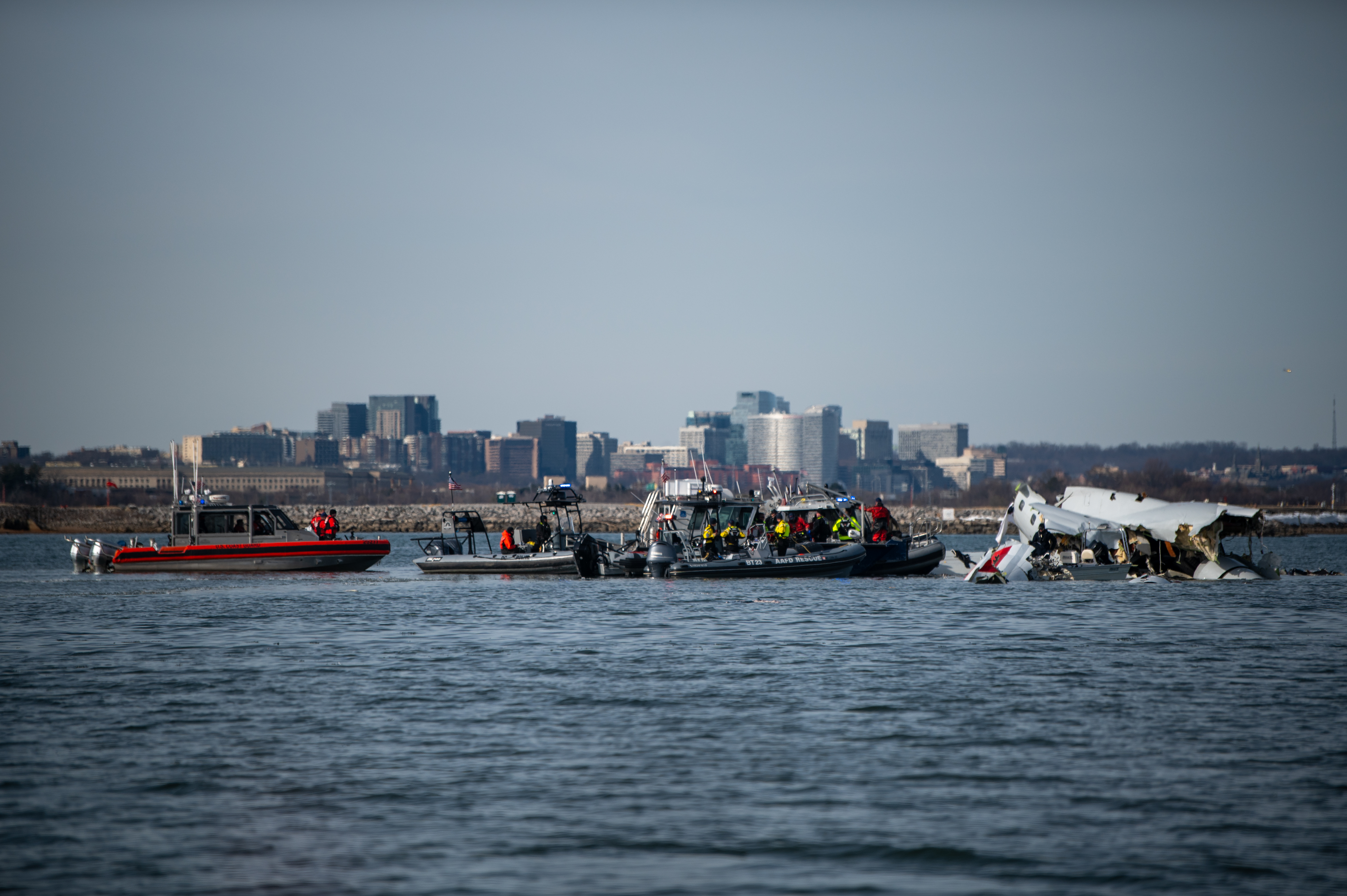
Coast Guard response teams at the scene on January 30

Trump received pushback and criticism for his claims that DEI initiatives were to blame for the crash, including by Buttigieg, who said that Trump's claims were "despicable" and that he should be "leading, not lying". Representative Ilhan Omar of Minnesota criticized Trump for "blaming this deadly crash on minorities and white women" and that the comments were "disgusting, racist and sexist". Senate Minority Leader Chuck Schumer of New York also criticized Trump's remarks, calling them "idle speculation". Maryland Senator Chris Van Hollen criticized Trump by stating that he was "making a political show out of this awful tragedy" about the crash. Senator Chris Murphy of Connecticut stated that Trump was "blaming Black people and blaming women who work at the FAA without any evidence." Representative Jesús "Chuy" García of Illinois stated that Trump was "exploiting disaster to continue to spread racist lies and divisiveness across the country." Sully Sullenberger responded to Trump by stating that "an airplane cannot know or care" about a pilot's race or gender but can only care about "what control inputs are made" and that he was "disgusted" by Trump's comments.

Meanwhile, Trump administration officials agreed with his claim that such policies may have caused the crash. Vice President JD Vance said, "When you don't have the best standards in who you're hiring, it means on the one hand, you're not getting the best people in government. But on the other hand, it puts stresses on the people who are already there." Sean Duffy, the transportation secretary, said, "We can only accept the best and the brightest in positions of safety," while Pete Hegseth, the United States Secretary of Defense, said, "The era of DEI is gone at the Defense Department and we need the best and brightest," including in "our air traffic control." Duffy also said, "What I've seen so far, do I think this was preventable? Absolutely." Hegseth also said that the helicopter crew was "fairly experienced," and undergoing "routine annual retraining—night flights on a standard [flight] corridor for a continuity-of-government mission." White House Press Secretary Karoline Leavitt supported Trump's claim by stating that it was "common sense" to be concerned about potential negative effects of DEI initiatives.

Duffy publicly blamed diversity and social justice, "when you don't focus on safety and you focus on social justice or the environment, bad things happen." He criticized the Biden administration and former Transportation Secretary Pete Buttigieg for changing terms like "cockpit" to the more gender-neutral "flight deck" and "Notice to Airmen" to "Notice to Air Mission," suggesting changes to terminology made aviation less safe. Duffy denied the current federal hiring freeze and buy-out scheme implemented by the Trump administration played any role in the FAA staff shortages of air traffic controllers.

=== International ===
The International Olympic Committee extended "heartfelt sympathies to all those affected, which we understand may include Olympians, young athletes, and their support staff." At the 2025 European Figure Skating Championships, which had begun the morning of the collision, a moment of silence was observed to mourn the figure skaters and family members lost. The International Skating Union and many international skating federations also offered condolences.

Pope Francis sent a telegram to the White House expressing condolences for the victims of the collision. The Russian Embassy in the United States sent condolences to the families of the Russian nationals who died in the crash. The Chinese foreign ministry expressed condolences to the families of the crash victims and demanded a full investigation of the disaster. Canadian Prime Minister Justin Trudeau offered his condolences "to the grieving family members and loved ones who are facing unimaginable loss."

== See also ==
- Allegheny Airlines Flight 853, a McDonnell Douglas DC-9 that collided mid-air with a Piper PA-28 aircraft on approach in 1969 due to failures in the collision avoidance capability of the FAA's ATC system.
- Hughes Airwest Flight 706, a McDonnell Douglas DC-9 that collided mid-air with an United States Marine Corps McDonnell F-4B Phantom II in 1971 due to failure of both crews to see and avoid each others.
- All Nippon Airways Flight 58, a Boeing 727 that collided mid-air with a JASDF Mitsubishi F-86F Sabre in 1971 due to the JASDF instructor unknowingly continuing the training flight into a commercial route.
- 2019 Alaska mid-air collision, a mid-air collision between 2 floatplanes that happened in 2019 due to limitations in the see and avoid concept and the lack of auditory and visual warning from both aircraft
- Sabena Flight 548, a fatal Boeing 707 crash that similarly impacted members of the U.S. Figure Skating team nearly 64 years earlier
- 2025 in aviation
- List of accidents involving sports teams
- List of mid-air collisions
