= Donald Angus Davison =

US Army general (1892–1944)

Donald A. Davison
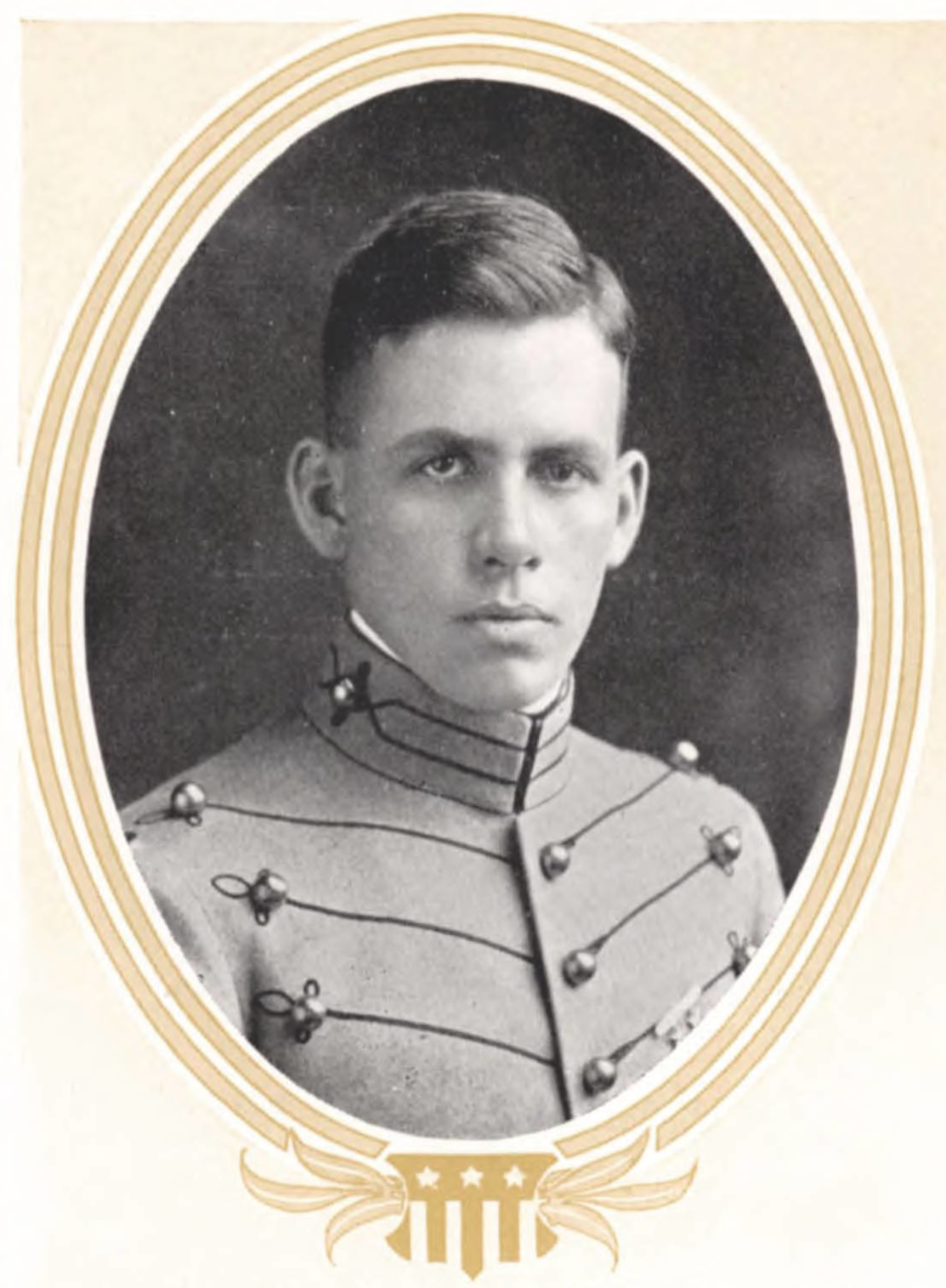
- At West Point in 1915
- Born: October 26, 1892; San Carlos, Arizona
- Died: May 6, 1944 (aged 51); Bangalore, India
- Burial place: Arlington National Cemetery
- Education: U.S. Military Academy
- Spouse: Marjorie (Risk) Davison
- Military career
- Allegiance: United States
- Branch: United States Army
- Service years: 1915–1944
- Rank: Major General (posthumous)
- Unit: Corps of Engineers

Donald Angus Davison (October 26, 1892 – May 6, 1944) was a major general and engineer in the United States Army.

== Biography ==
Davison was born on October 26, 1892, in San Carlos, Arizona, the second child of Lieutenant Colonel Lorenzo Paul Davison of Beaver Dam, Wisconsin and his first wife, Carolyn Lavina Shannon. He married Marjorie Risk, who died in 1986. Davison died on May 6, 1944, near Bangalore, India. He and Marjorie are buried at Arlington National Cemetery, along with his father.

== Career ==
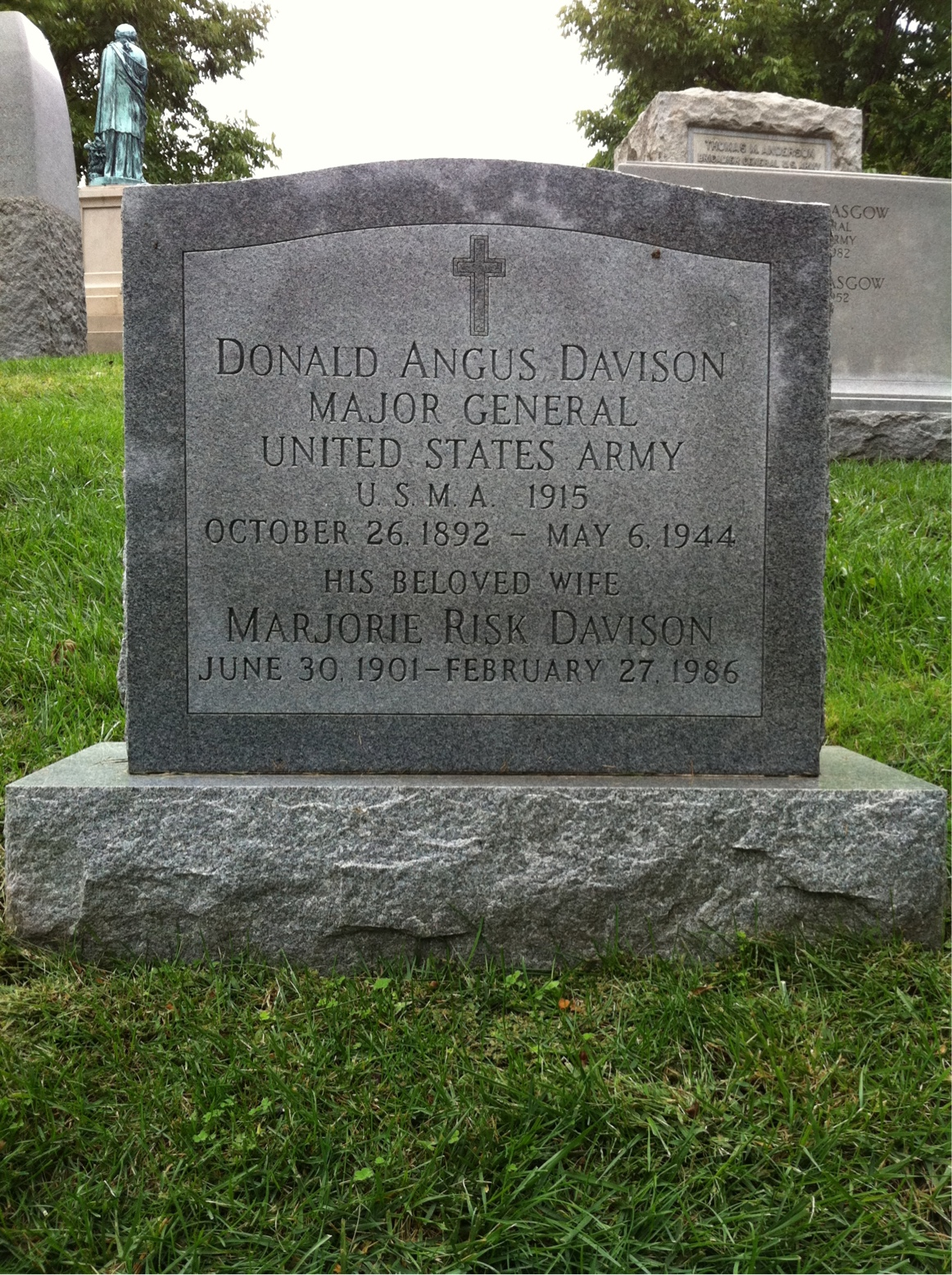
Grave at Arlington National Cemetery

Davison graduated from the United States Military Academy (West Point) in 1915, a member of "The class the stars fell on", that spawned 59 general officers out of a class of 164. Graduating high in his class, he was commissioned into the U.S. Army Corps of Engineers.

In May 1941, Davison was sent to Britain to observe British wartime engineering and became the Engineering Officer, U.S. Army Forces British Isles in May 1942, within the Services of Supply, ETO. He participated in the North African Campaign and the China Burma India Theater. Davison held the rank of brigadier general when he died suddenly in India on May 6, 1944, and was posthumously promoted to major general.

Davison Army Airfield in northern Virginia is named for him; the facility is adjacent to Fort Belvoir, fifteen miles (24 km) southwest of Washington, D.C.
