= Davison Army Airfield =

Military airport in Fairfax County, Virginia, US

- Part of Fort Belvoir
- Fairfax County, Virginia in the United States
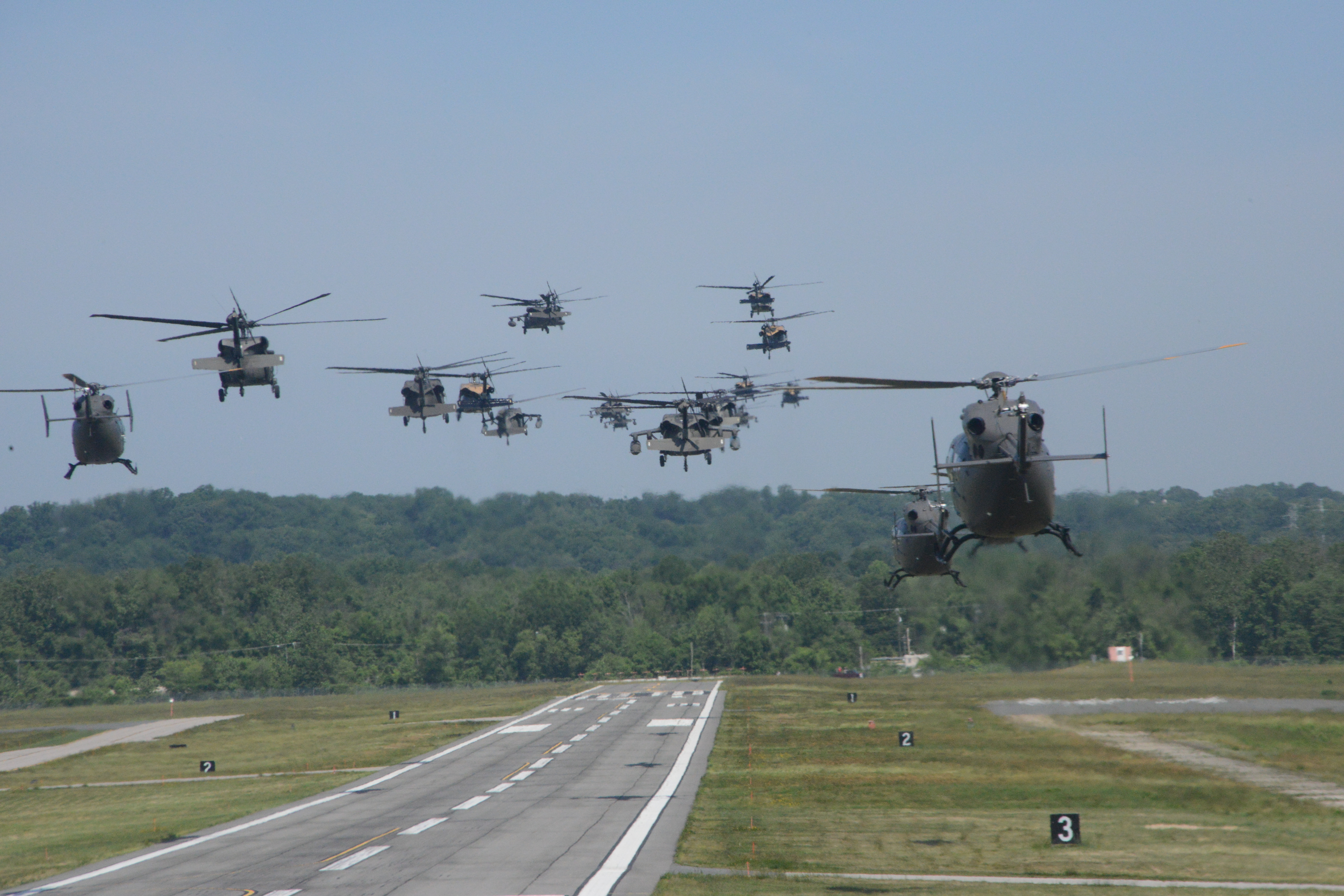
- VH-60M Black Hawk and UH-72 Lakota helicopters of the 12th Aviation Battalion lift off from Davison AAF during June 2014

- U.S. Army Military District of Washington

Site information
- Type: Army Airfield
- Owner: Department of Defense
- Operator: U.S. Army
- Controlled by: Military District of Washington
- Condition: Operational
- Website: Official website

Location
- Location in the United States Location in Virginia
- Coordinates: 38°42′54″N 077°10′52″W

Site history
- Built: 1952; 74 years ago
- In use: 1952 – present

Garrison information
- Garrison: The Army Aviation Brigade

Airfield information
- Identifiers: ICAO: KDAA, FAA LID: DAA
- Elevation: 22.4 m (73 ft) AMSL
Runways
Direction	Length and surface
14/32	1,652.3 m (5,421 ft) Asphalt
Helipads
Number	Length and surface
H1	15.2 m (50 ft)

Davison Army Airfield or Davison AAF (IATA: DAA, ICAO: KDAA, FAA LID: DAA) is a military use airport of the United States Army in Fairfax County, Virginia, serving adjacent Fort Belvoir. Located fifteen miles (24 km) southwest of Washington, D.C., the facility was named for noted World War II aviation engineer Brig. Gen. Donald Angus Davison.

The airfield provided support for Army One from 1957 to 1976 for presidents Dwight Eisenhower, John F. Kennedy, Lyndon Johnson, Richard Nixon, and Gerald Ford. Its role of support for the presidential helicopter ended in 1976 when that responsibility was transferred entirely to the U.S. Marine Corps. The 12th Aviation Battalion (part of The Army Aviation Brigade, TAAB) now operates Davison AAF and the Pentagon helicopter pad. The battalion's 18 UH-60 Blackhawks, including four VH-60 models ("Gold Tops"), is responsible for priority regional transport for U.S. Army and Pentagon senior leadership.

The Civil Air Patrol National Capitol Wing uses a small tower for use during exercises and flights, and bases their four Cessna 172 and 182s there.

A helicopter operating a training flight from Davison was involved in the 2025 Potomac River mid-air collision in late January.

== Facilities ==
Davison AAF has one runway designated 14/32 with an asphalt surface measuring 5,618 by 74 feet (1,712 by 23 m).
