= 12th Aviation Battalion =

United States military unit, established 1966

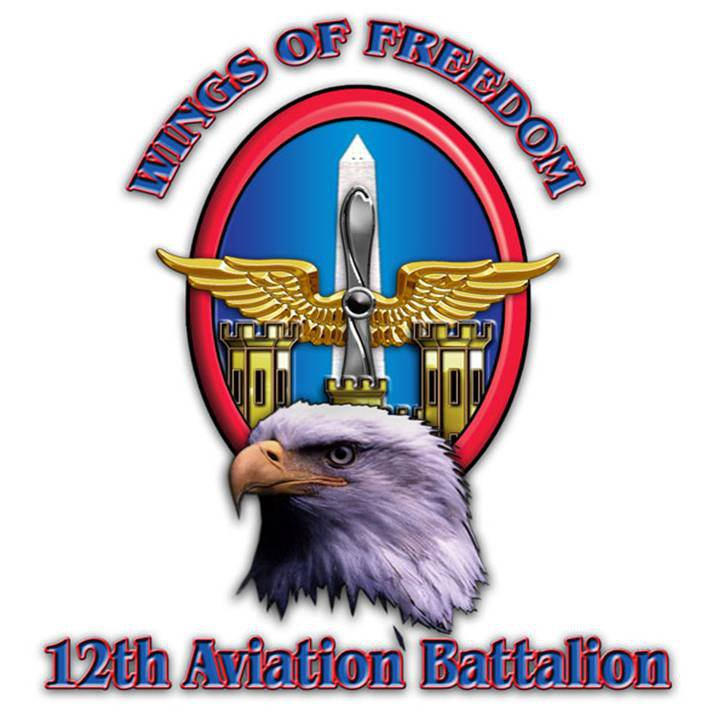
- Active: 1966–present
- Country: United States
- Branch: United States Army
- Type: Aviation Battalion
- Part of: The Army Aviation Brigade (TAAB)
- Garrison/HQ: Davison Army Airfield, Fort Belvoir, Virginia
- Nickname: "Capitol Guardians"
- Motto: "Wings of Freedom"

Commanders
- Current commander: LTC Erika A. Holownia

The 12th Aviation Battalion is a unit of the United States Army Aviation Branch. It is responsible for many rotary-wing flight operations for government officials in the National Capital Region (NCR), the area around Washington DC. The 12th Aviation Battalion is immediately subordinate to The Army Aviation Brigade (TAAB) and operates the Sikorsky UH-60 Black Hawk.

== Mission ==
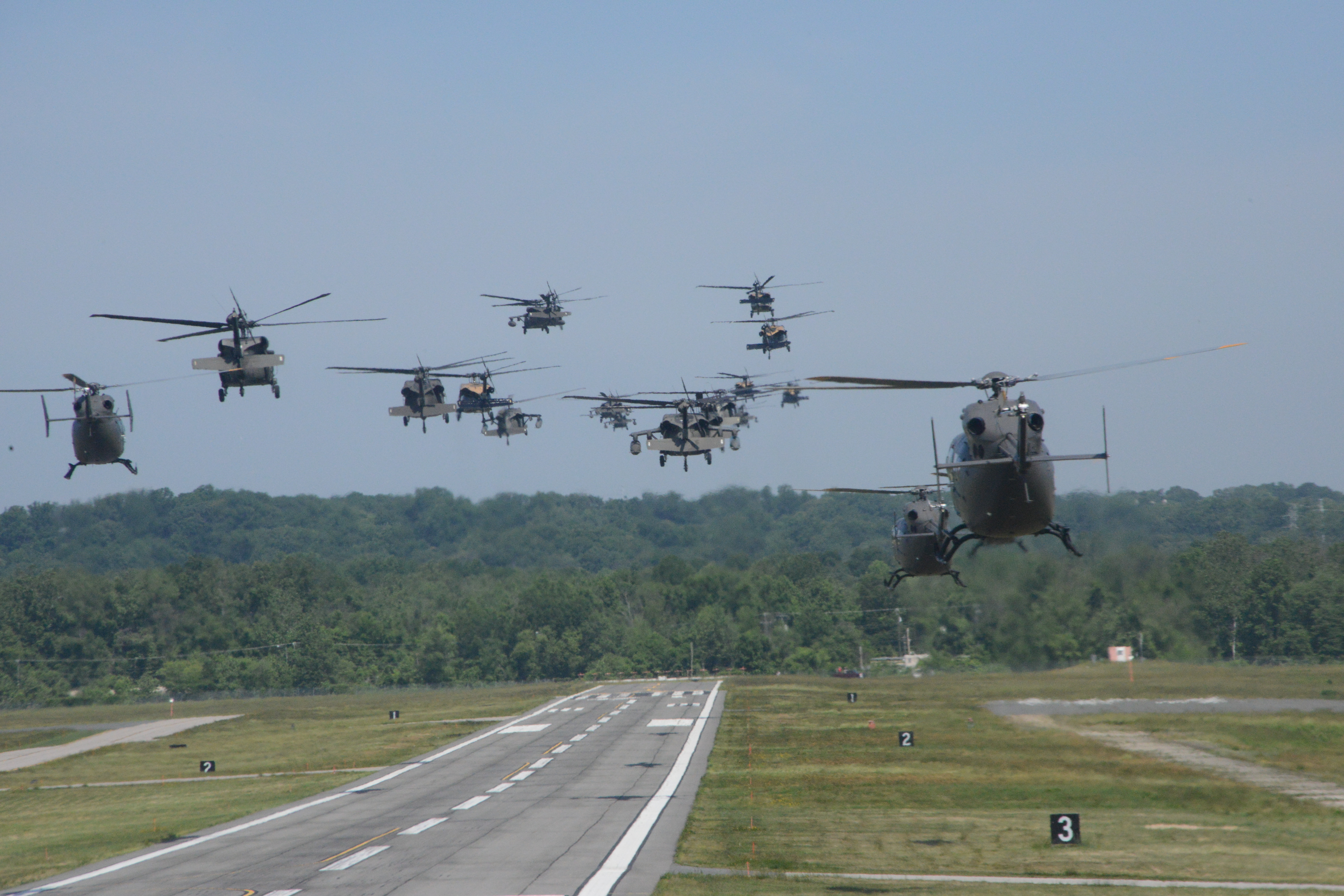
Seventeen VH-60A Black Hawks and seven UH-72 Lakota helicopters from the 12th Aviation Battalion (Army Air Operations Group, Military District of Washington, U.S. Army) lift off from Davison Army Airfield beginning a one-hour training flight over the skies of the National Capital Region, June 4, 2014.

The battalion is a unit of The Army Aviation Brigade (TAAB) under the Military District of Washington (MDW). Its primary mission is to provide executive transport, aeromedical evacuation, and operational aviation support to senior government officials, including the President, Vice President, Secretary of Defense, and other senior military leaders. The battalion is also responsible for homeland security, contingency response, and emergency operations within the NCR.

== Organization ==
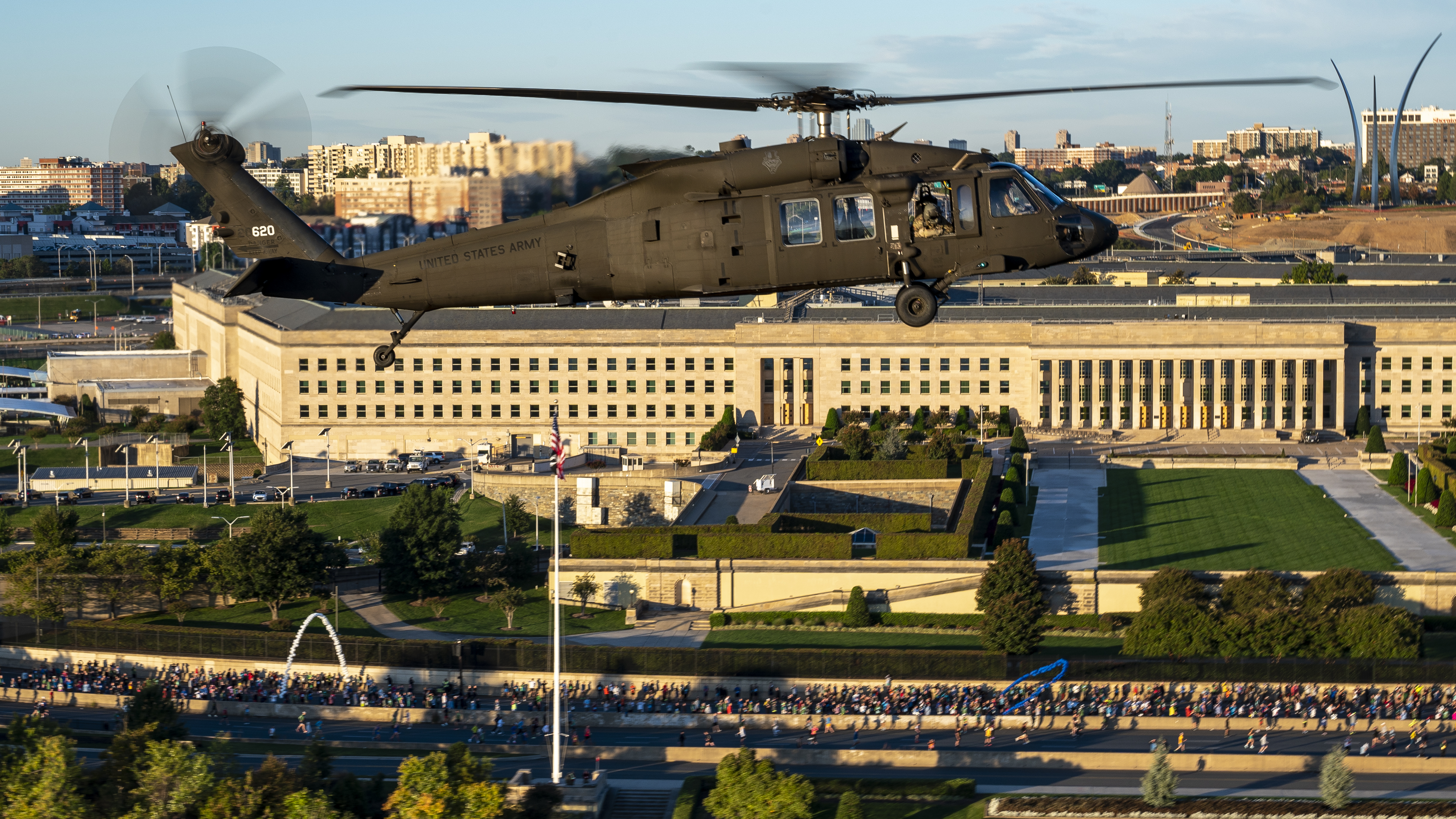
A UH-60M of 12th Aviation Battalion in front of the Pentagon during the 2023 Army Ten-Miler.

In addition to its headquarters company, the 12th Aviation Battalion comprises three helicopter companies (Alpha, Bravo, Charlie), a maintenance company (Delta), and an airfield service/base operation/air traffic control company (Echo).

== History ==
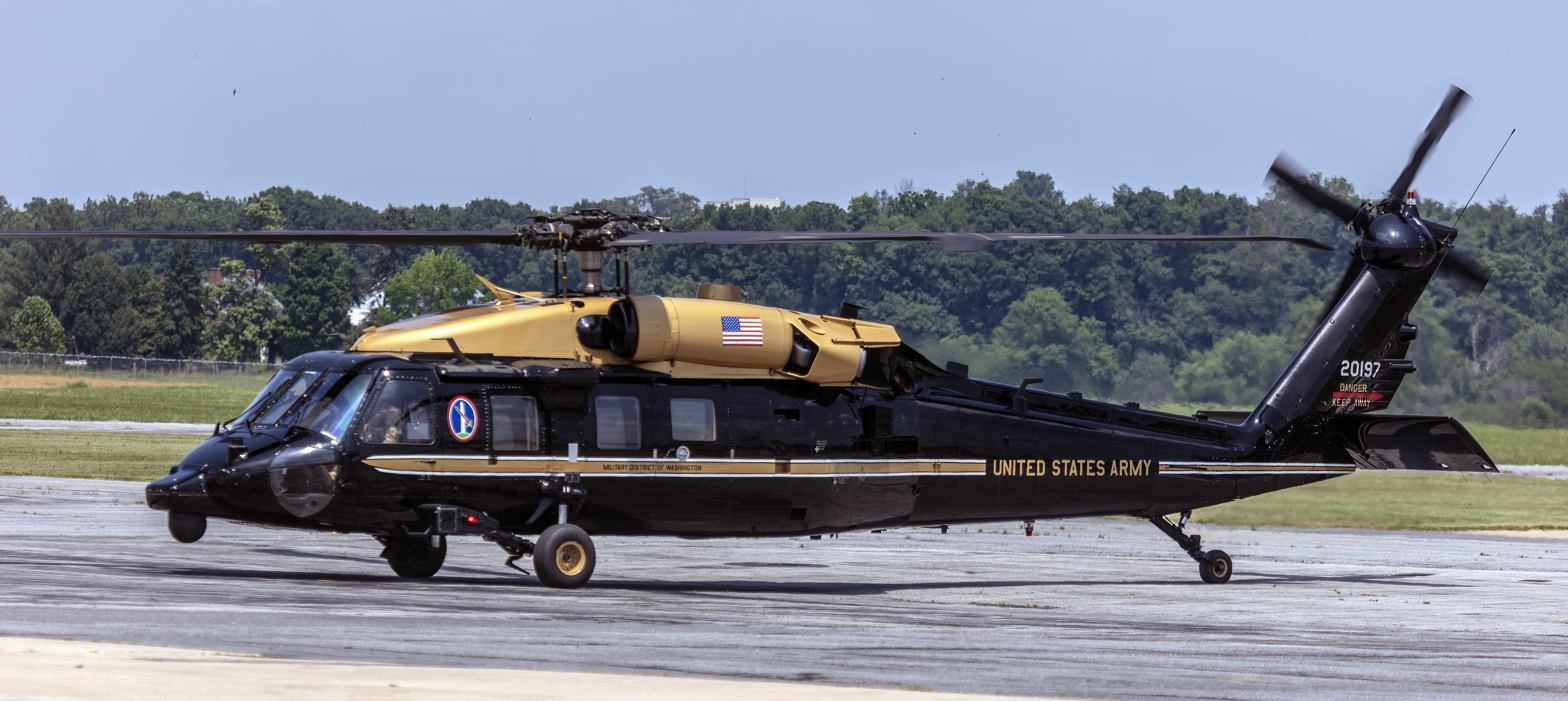
VH-60M Black Hawk of 12th Aviation Battalion at Frederick Municipal Airport (Maryland), 2022.

The 12th Aviation Battalion was activated in 1966 to move senior officials by helicopter. Initially, it operated a mix of fixed-wing and rotary-wing aircraft to transport senior military leaders and government officials.

In September 2004, 12th Aviation Battalion stopped operating the Bell UH-1 Iroquois.

In June 2014, it stopped operating the UH-72 Lakota.

== Accidents and incidents ==
On January 29, 2025, American Eagle Flight 5342, operated by PSA Airlines, collided mid-air with a Sikorsky UH-60L Black Hawk from Company B, 12th Aviation Battalion, killing all 67 people on board both aircraft. Flight 5342, was a Bombardier CRJ701ER, which was a scheduled domestic passenger flight from Wichita Dwight D. Eisenhower National Airport in Kansas to Ronald Reagan Washington National Airport near Washington, D.C.
