= EarthCam =

American Webcam network

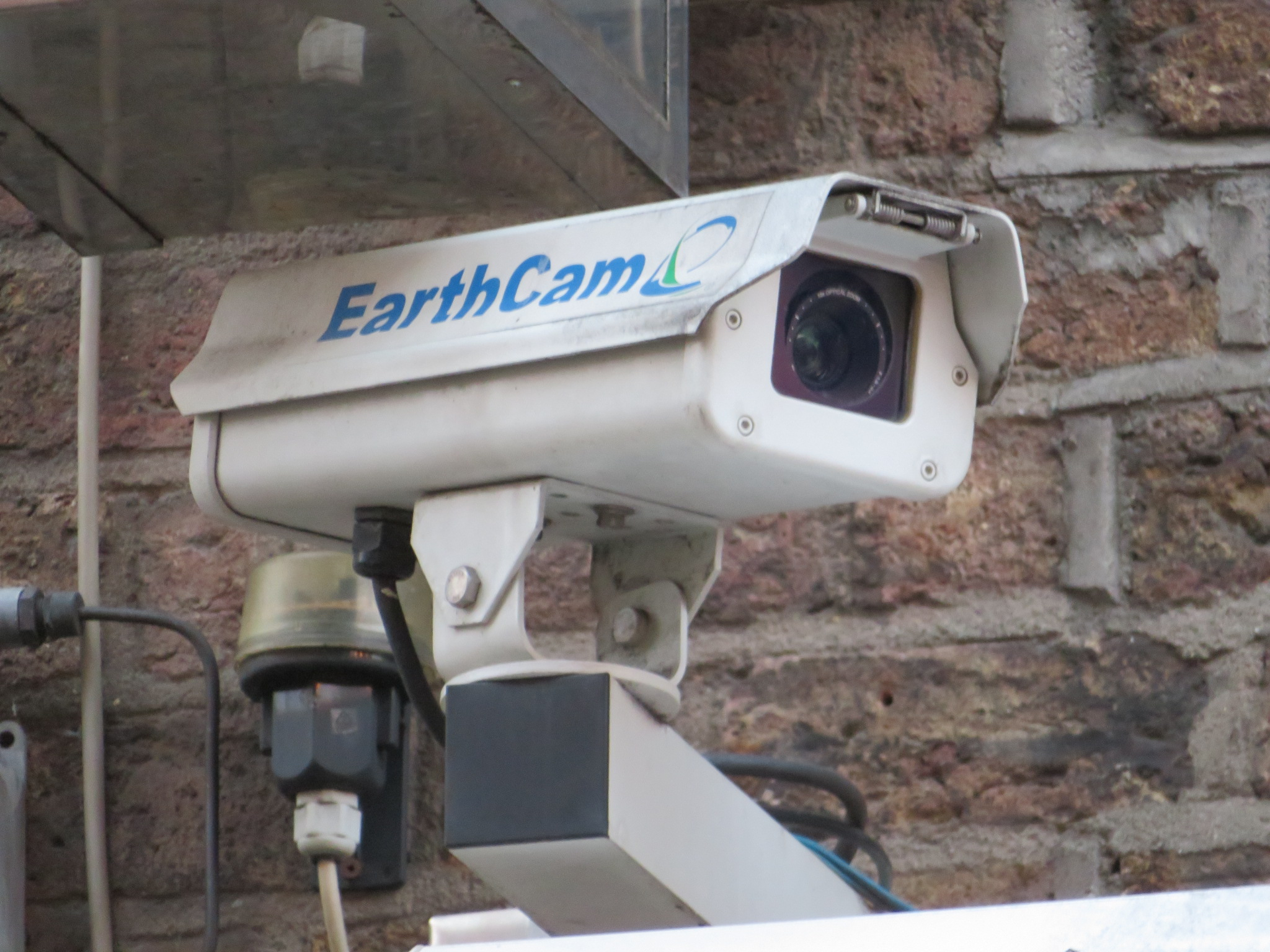
- An EarthCam in Dublin, Ireland
- Website type: Webcam Network
- Available in: English
- Owner: Brian Cury
- Creator: Brian Cury
- Website: earthcam.com
- Commercial: Yes
- Registration: Optional
- Launched: March 27, 1996; 30 years ago
- Current status: Active

EarthCam, Inc. is an American company based in Upper Saddle River, New Jersey, that provides webcam technology and services. Founded in 1996 by Brian Cury, the company's website, EarthCam.com, provides a network of live webcams from locations around the world.

The company's business is providing webcam technology and managed services for business and government applications, with its consumer-facing website serving as a network of thousands of cameras.

== History ==
EarthCam was founded in 1996 by Brian Cury. By 1999, The New York Times reported that 20 people per day were adding their webcams to the site. In 2006, the website won a Webby Award in the Tourism category.

For New Year's Eve 1999, the site hosted an event featuring 100 cameras from around the world to broadcast celebrations for the turn of the millennium.

In October 2011, EarthCam donated and installed five cameras in the torch of the Statue of Liberty. The cameras provide views from a location that had been closed to the public since 1916.

For the 2016 New Year's Eve celebration, EarthCam streamed the first 4K video of the Times Square Ball drop on YouTube.

== Notable projects and webcams ==
EarthCam operates cameras at public landmarks, including the Martin Luther King Jr. Memorial in Washington D.C., the Flight 93 National Memorial in Shanksville, Pennsylvania, and London's Abbey Road.

The company has also used its cameras to produce time-lapse videos of major construction projects. A notable example is a time-lapse showing the 10-year construction of the National September 11 Memorial & Museum, created from images captured at the site from 2001 to 2011.
