= Fort Belvoir =

United States Army installation and a CDP in Virginia

- Fairfax County, Virginia, U.S.
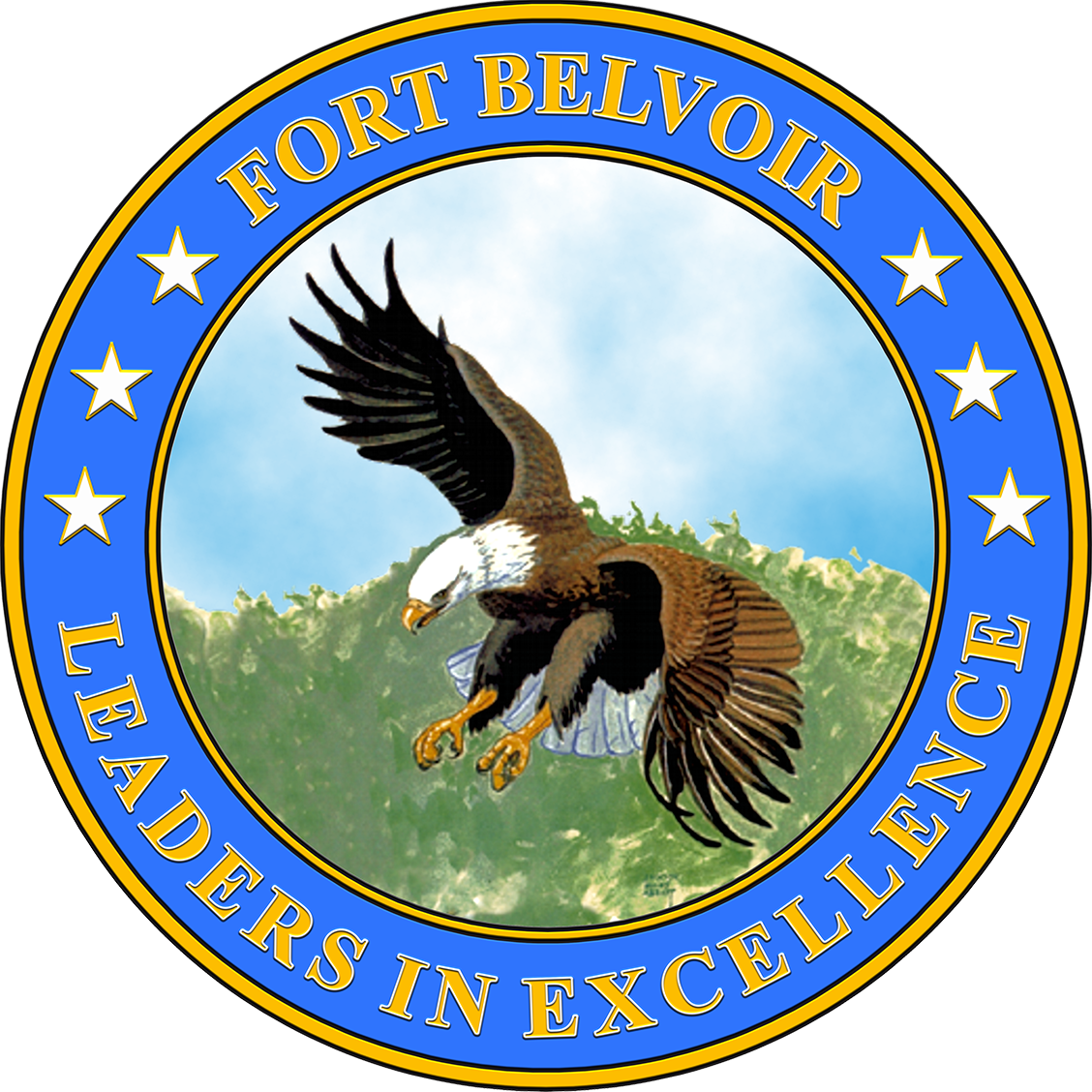
- Seal

Site information
- Controlled by: U.S. Army

Location
- Location within Northern Virginia Location within Virginia Location within the United States
- Coordinates: 38°43′11″N 77°09′16″W

Site history
- Built: 1917

Garrison information
- Current commander: COL Joseph V. Messina
- Garrison: 29th Infantry Division (Light); 9th Theater Support Command; 1st Information Operations Command (Land); 12th Aviation Battalion (MDW); 249th Engineer Battalion (Prime Power); 212th Military Police Detachment (MDW); 55th Ordnance Company (EOD); 75th MP Detachment (CID); Army Intelligence and Security Command; Military Intelligence Readiness Command; 902nd Military Intelligence Group; Defense Logistics Agency; Defense Contract Audit Agency; Defense Threat Reduction Agency; Missile Defense Agency; National Geospatial-Intelligence Agency; Aerospace Data Facility-East
- Occupants: 51,000+ employees (Fort Belvoir); 7,637 residents (Fort Belvoir CDP)

Fort Belvoir (/ˈbɛlvwɑːr/ BEL-vwar) is a United States Army installation and a census-designated place (CDP) in Fairfax County, Virginia, United States. It was developed on the site of the former Belvoir plantation, seat of the prominent Fairfax family for whom Fairfax County was named. It was known as Camp A. A. Humphreys from 1917 to 1935.

Fort Belvoir is home to a number of significant United States military organizations. With nearly twice as many workers as the Pentagon, Fort Belvoir is the largest employer in Fairfax County. Fort Belvoir comprises three geographically distinct areas: the main base, Davison Army Airfield, and Fort Belvoir North.

== History ==
=== Plantation ===
The Fort Belvoir site was originally the home of William Fairfax, the cousin and land agent of Thomas Fairfax, 6th Lord Fairfax of Cameron, the proprietor of the Northern Neck, which stood on land now part of the base. William Fairfax purchased the property in 1738, when his cousin arranged for him to be appointed customs agent (tax collector) for the Potomac River, and William erected an elegant brick mansion overlooking the river, moving in with his family in 1740. Lord Fairfax came to America in 1747 and stayed less than a year at the Belvoir estate before moving to Greenway Court. The Fairfax family lived at Belvoir for over 30 years, but eldest son (and heir) George William Fairfax sailed to England on business in 1773, never to return. The manor home was destroyed by fire in 1783.

The ruins of the Belvoir Mansion and the nearby Fairfax family grave site are listed on the National Register of Historic Places.

=== Fort ===
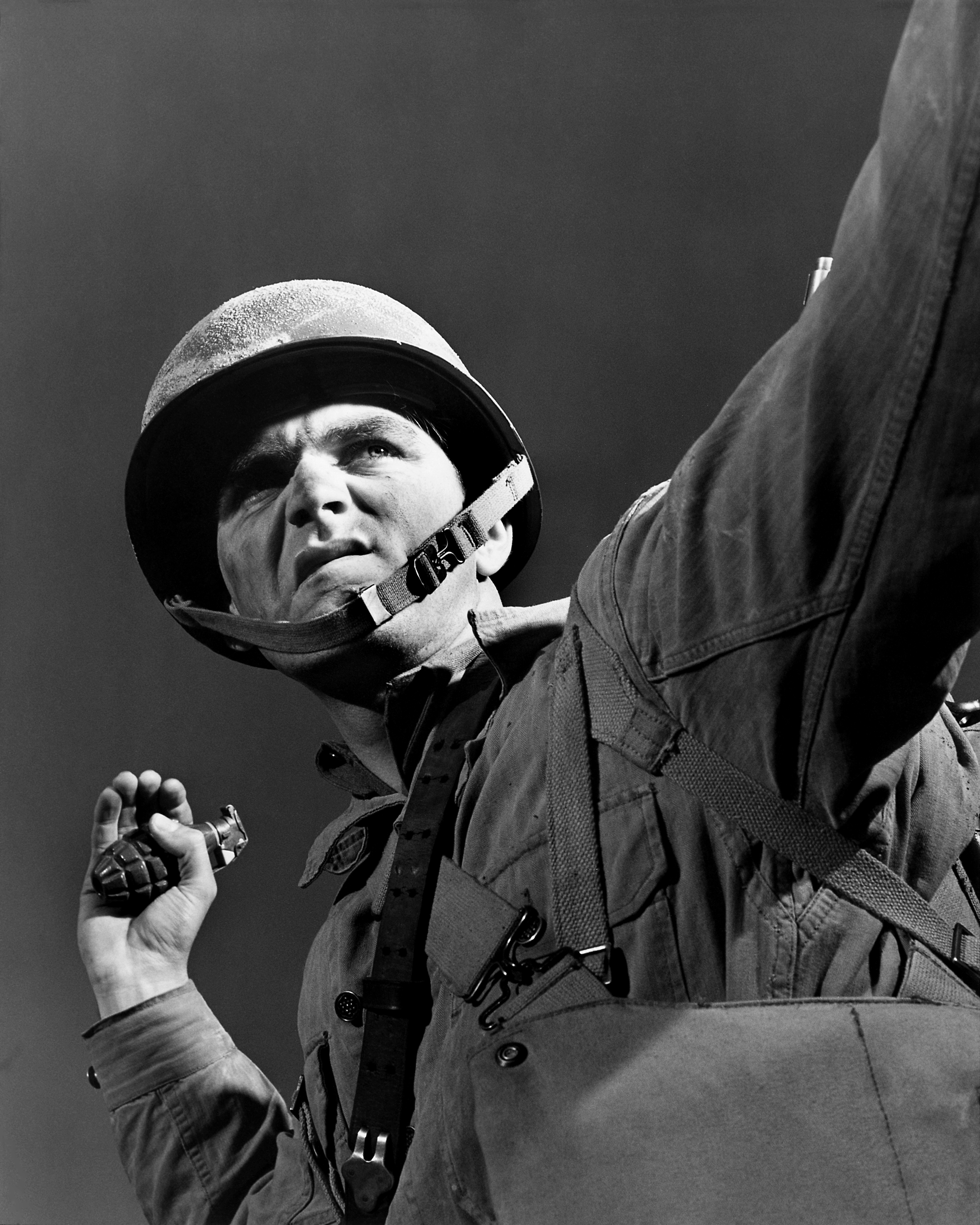
An infantryman in training at Fort Belvoir in November 1942, during World War II

The post was founded during World War I as Camp A. A. Humphreys, named for Union Army Major General Andrew A. Humphreys, who was the Chief Engineer of the United States Army immediately following the Civil War. The post was renamed Fort Belvoir in the 1935 by President Franklin D. Roosevelt at the request of Howard W. Smith, a Congressman from Virginia, in recognition of the Belvoir plantation that once occupied the site. The adjacent United States Army Corps of Engineers Humphreys Engineer Center retains part of the original name.

Camp Humphreys was established in World War I as the U.S. Army Engineers Training School. In December 1917, the Secretary of War approved construction of a cantonment at Fort Belvoir for 30,000 engineer replacement troops. It served as the postgraduate institution for U.S. Military Academy engineers and a finishing school for engineering troops headed to war.

The Combat Developments Command, established in 1962 under Lieutenant General John P. Daley (1962–63), was located at Fort Belvoir. Lieutenant General John Norton (general) was its last commander. Occupying the position until June 1973, Norton assisted in the continued reorganization of the Army, unsuccessfully attempting to preserve CDC, which was later merged into the new Training and Doctrine Command.

The engineer school, which came to host the Engineer Officer Basic Course, relocated in 1988 from Fort Belvoir to Fort Leonard Wood, Missouri.

As a result of the 2005 Base Realignment and Closure Commission, a substantial number of personnel were transferred to Fort Belvoir, and others were civilians employed there. All major Washington, DC-area National Geospatial-Intelligence Agency (NGA) facilities, including those in Bethesda, Maryland, Reston, Virginia, and Washington, DC, were consolidated at a new facility, the NGA Campus East, situated on the former Engineer Proving Ground site. The cost of the new center was $2.4 billion.

In March 2017, the Army Historical Foundation announced its intent to begin the construction of the National Museum of the United States Army at Fort Belvoir. The museum, set on 84 acres (34 ha), tells the story of the army since 1775. The 185,000-square-foot (17,200 m^{2}) museum features historical galleries, an interactive Experiential Learning Center, and the Army Theater. The outdoor venues include a Memorial Garden, Amphitheater, Parade Ground, and Army Trail. It opened to the public on 11 November 2020.

In 2020, in the wake of the George Floyd protests and petitions to rename U.S. Army bases with names related to the Confederacy, the fort was proposed to be renamed, as well. While not named after a Confederate officer, it was renamed after a slave plantation that was once owned by prominent 18th-century Loyalist landowner George William Fairfax. Representative Howard W. Smith, who requested the 1930 renaming, was an old-school Southern Democrat who was sympathetic to the then-popular Dunning School of history that revered the Confederacy, and resented a base in Virginia being named after Andrew A. Humphreys, a Union Army general. The name of the base has been criticized as improperly nostalgic for slavery and the antebellum era.

In June 2021, the fort was initially included in a list of military bases to be considered for renaming by a newly created Naming Commission. Later in March 2022, the commission determined that Fort Belvoir did not meet the criteria provided in the 2021 National Defense Authorization Act for making a renaming recommendation, but the commission recommended that the Department of Defense conduct its own review of the naming of the fort based on results of the commission's historical research.

== Units and agencies ==
Fort Belvoir serves as the headquarters for the Defense Logistics Agency, the Defense Acquisition University, the Defense Contract Audit Agency, the Defense Technical Information Center, the United States Army Intelligence and Security Command, the United States Army Military Intelligence Readiness Command, the Missile Defense Agency, the Defense Threat Reduction Agency, and the National Geospatial-Intelligence Agency.

Fort Belvoir is home to the Virginia National Guard's 29th Infantry Division (Light) and elements of 10 Army major commands; 19 different agencies and direct reporting units of the Department of Army; eight elements of the United States Army Reserve and the Army National Guard; and 26 Department of Defense agencies. Also located here are the 249th Engineer Battalion (Prime Power), the Military District of Washington's 12th Aviation Battalion, which provides rotary-wing movement to the DoD and Congress, a Marine Corps detachment, a United States Air Force activity, United States Army Audit Agency, and an agency from the Department of the Treasury. In addition, Fort Belvoir is home to National Reconnaissance Office's Aerospace Data Facility-East (ADF-E).

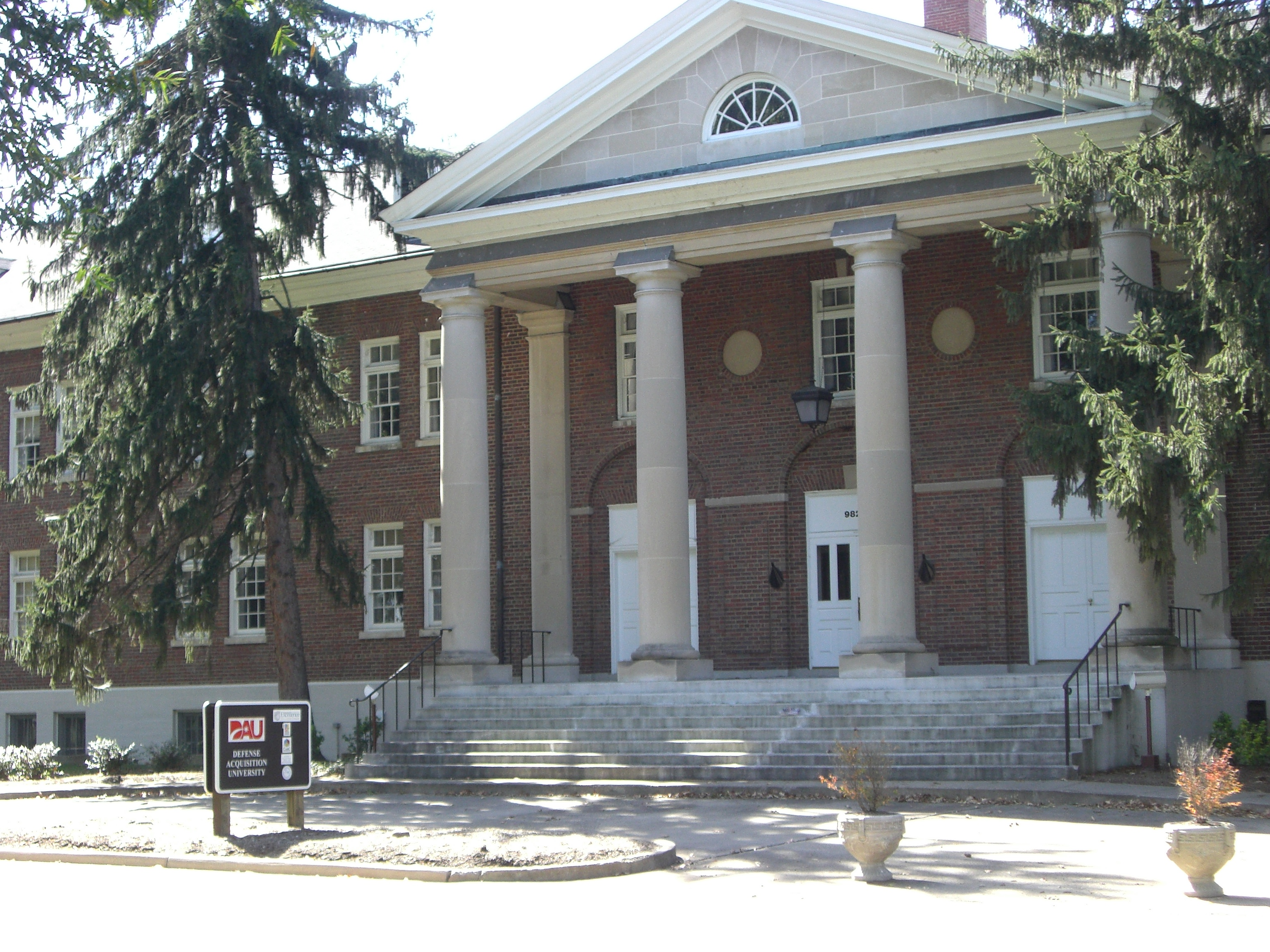
Defense Acquisition University headquarters

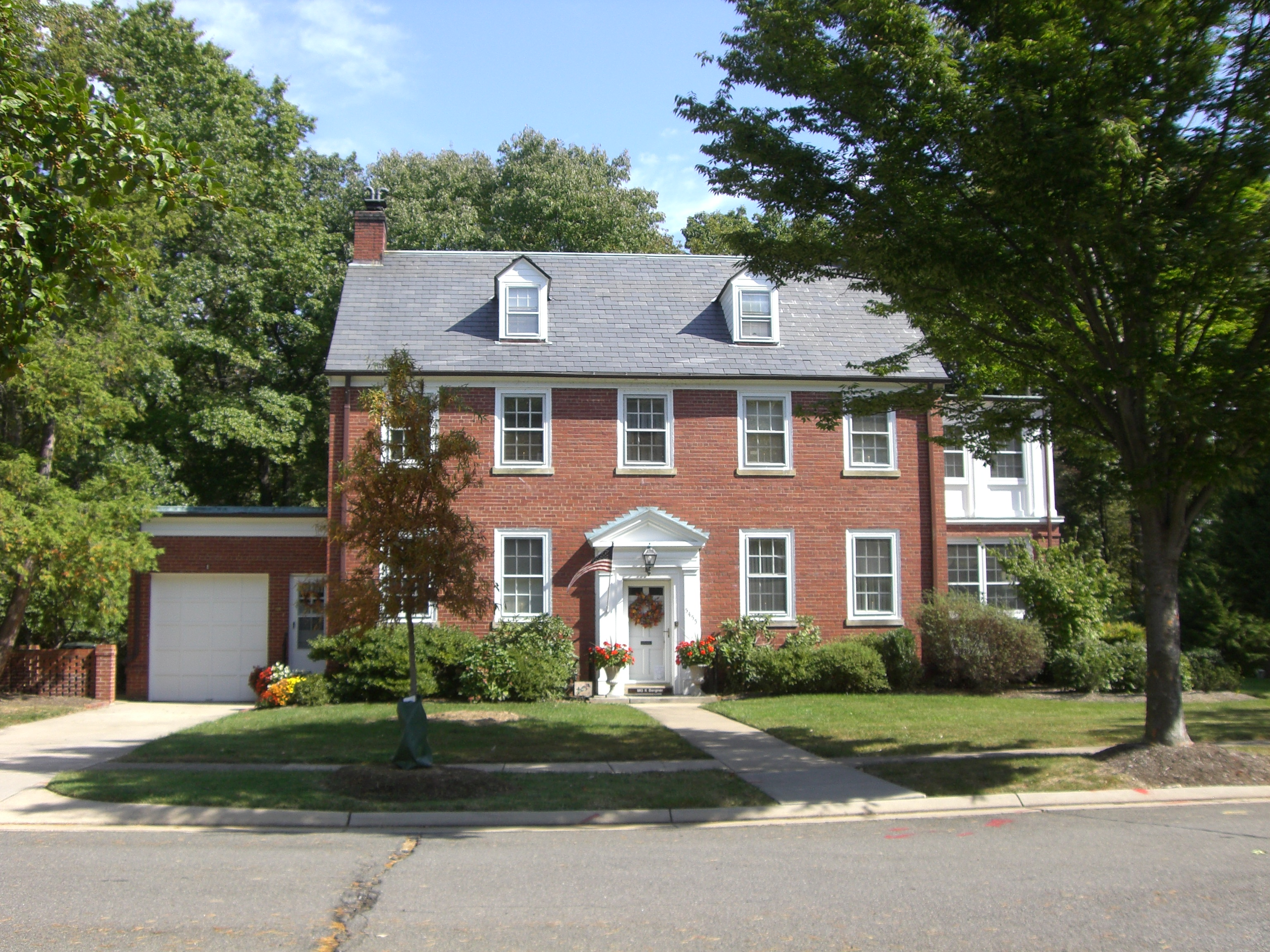
Senior officer housing

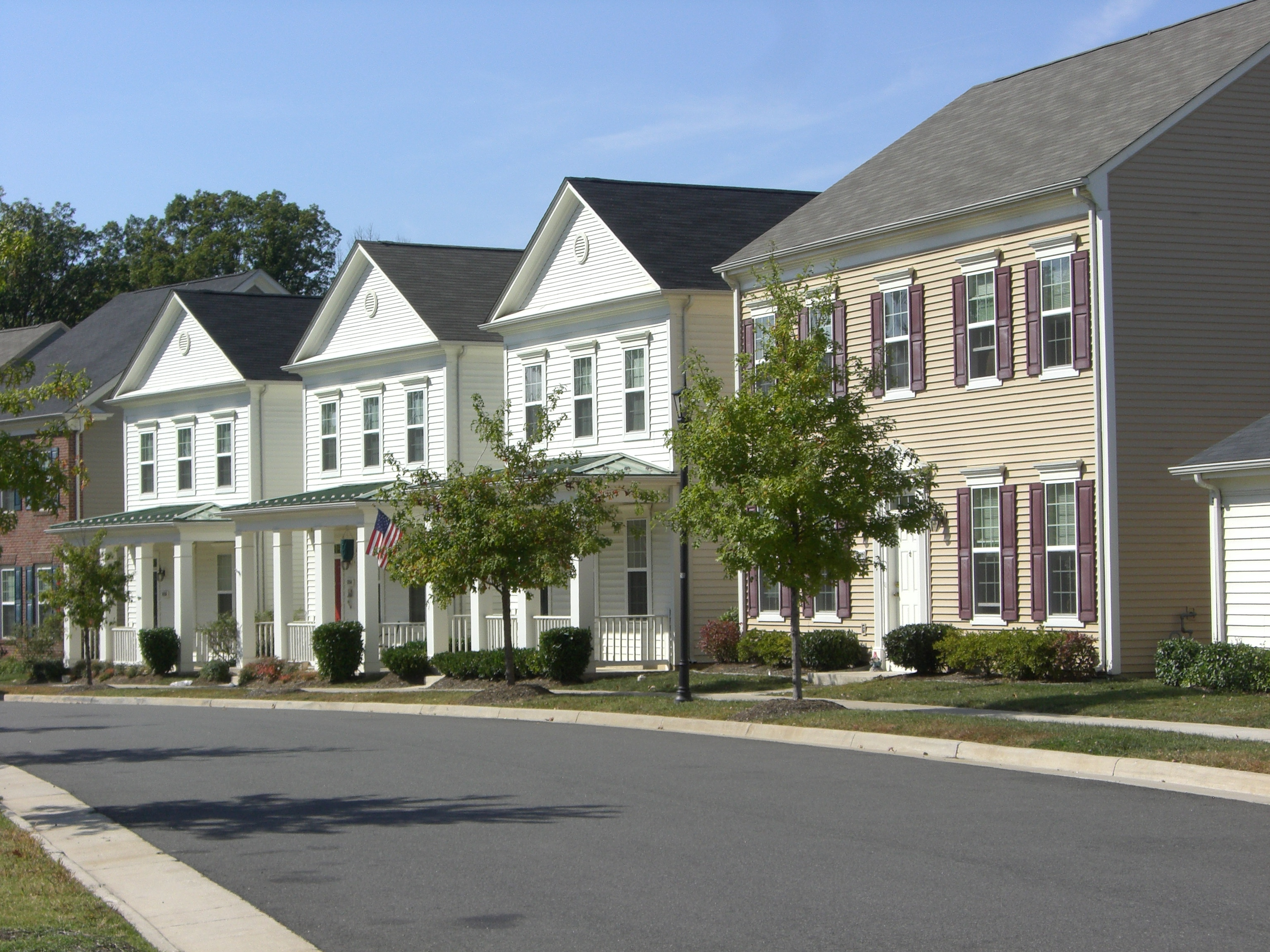
Enlisted housing

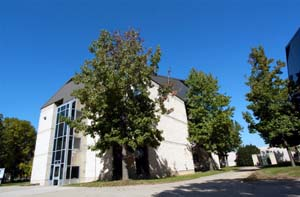
McRee Barracks complex

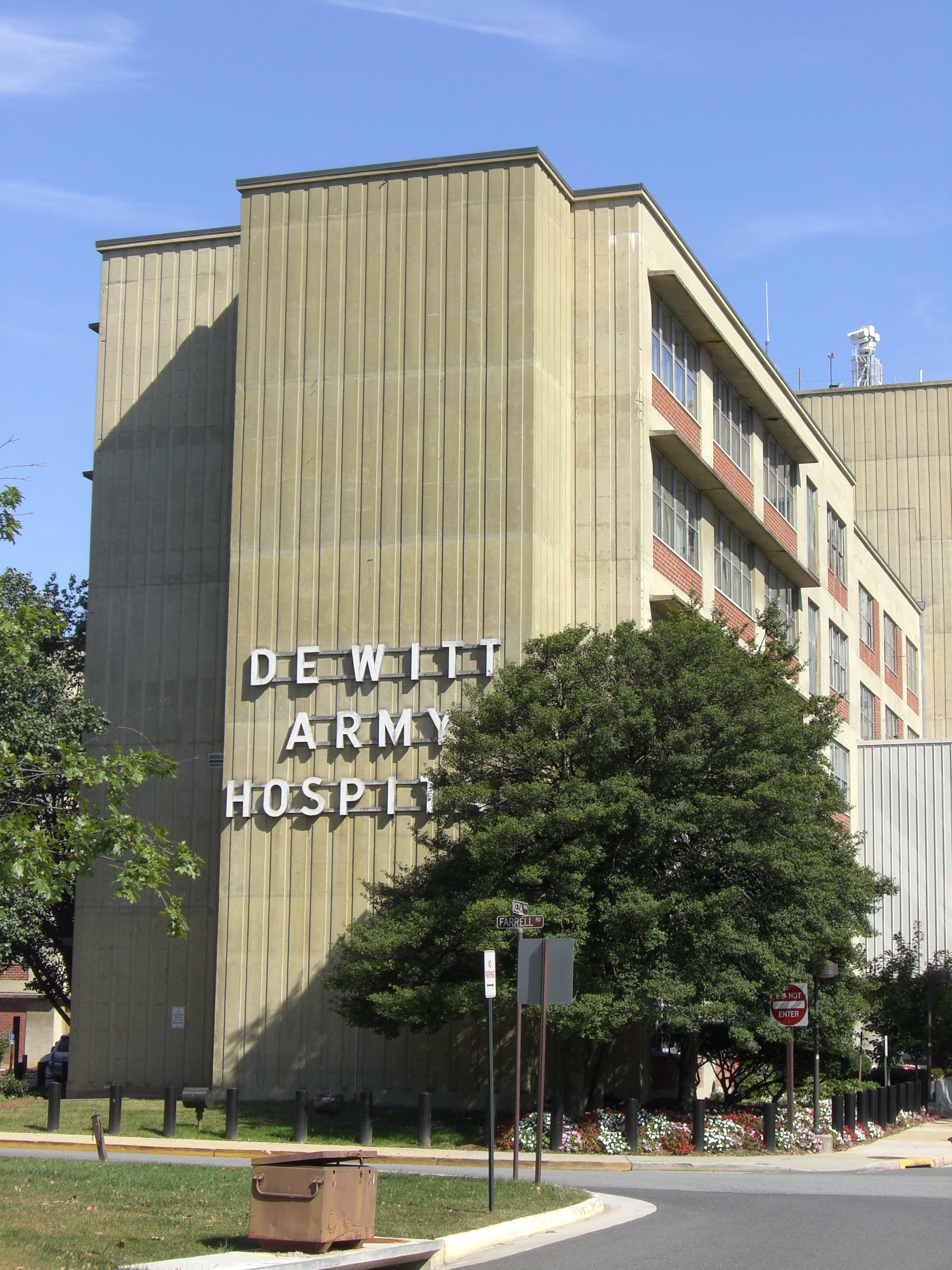
DeWitt Army Hospital (1957–2011)

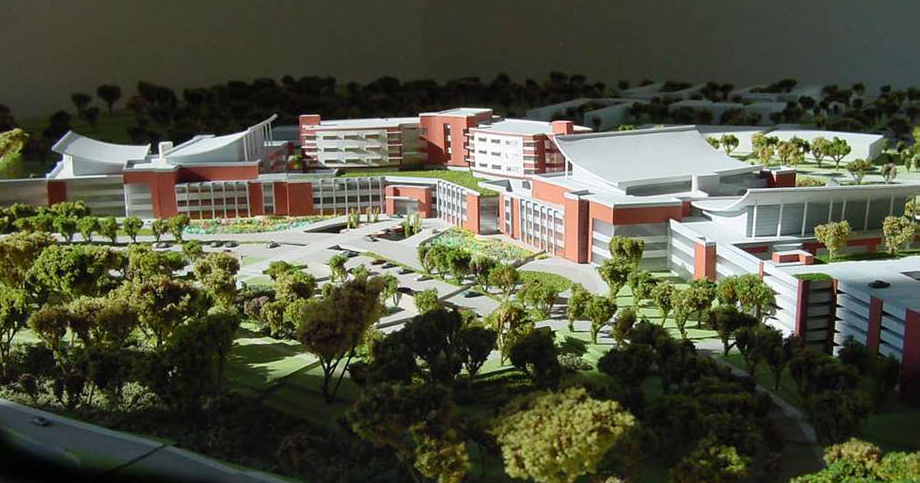
Community Hospital

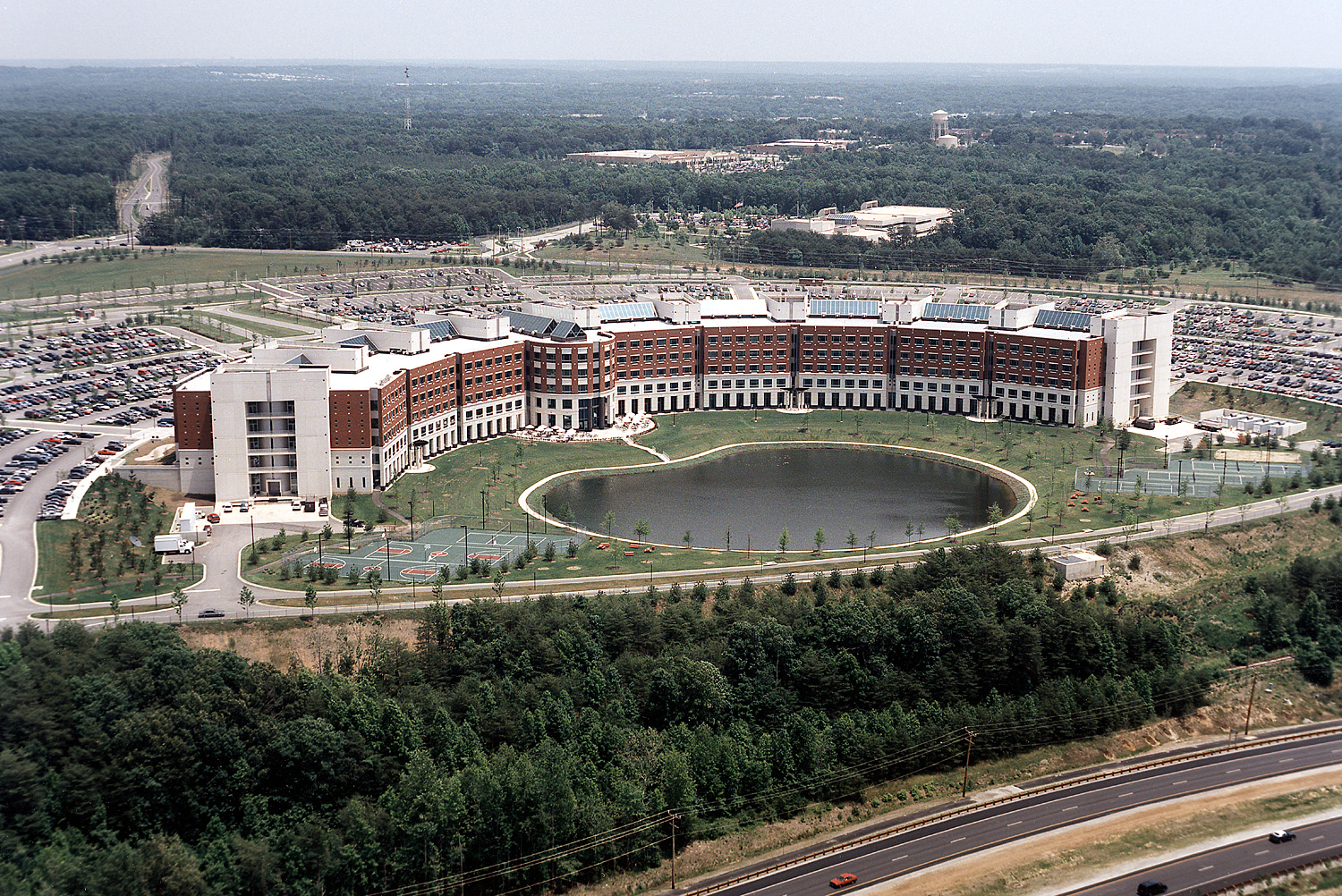
DLA headquarters

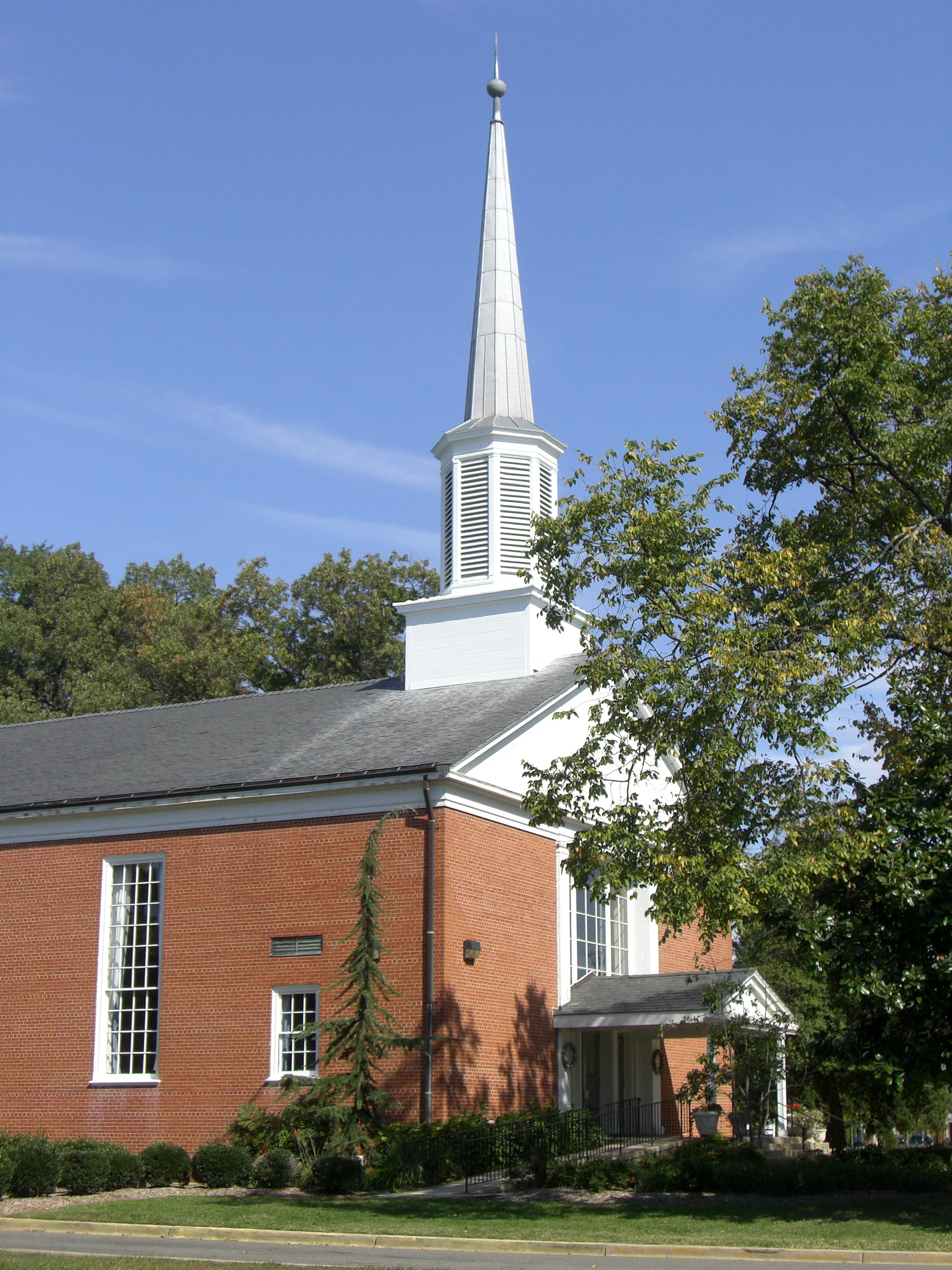
Post Chapel

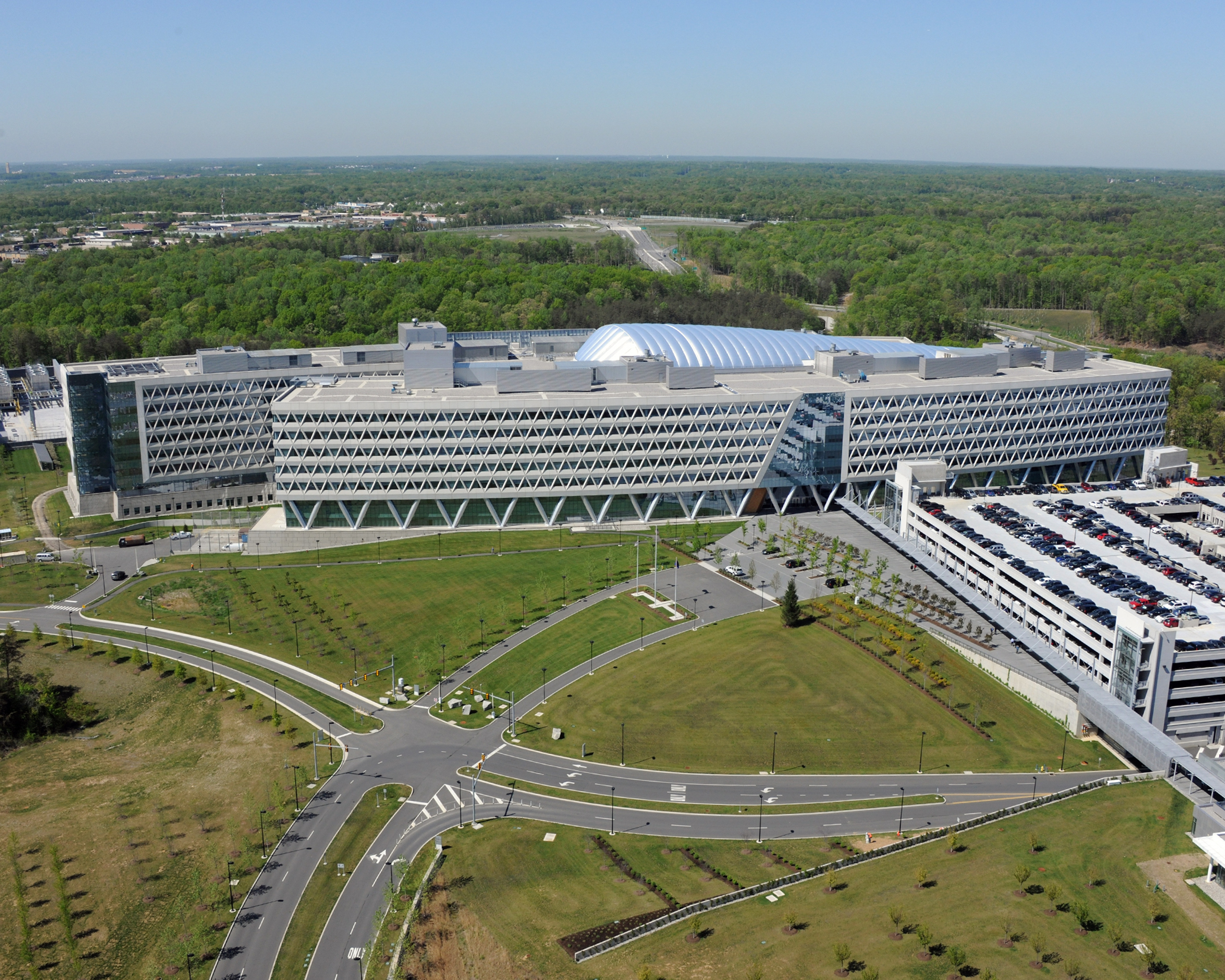
NGA Campus East

== Demographics ==
Location of Fort Belvoir in Fairfax County, Virginia

Fort Belvoir is a census-designated place, consisting of the South Post and North Post and excluding Davison Army Airfield, the North Area, and the Southwest Area. Neighboring CDPs are Mount Vernon to the east, Woodlawn and Groveton to the northeast, Hayfield and Kingstowne to the north, and Franconia and Newington to the northwest.

=== 2020 census ===
Fort Belvoir CDP, Virginia – Racial and ethnic composition Note: the US Census treats Hispanic/Latino as an ethnic category. This table excludes Latinos from the racial categories and assigns them to a separate category. Hispanics/Latinos may be of any race.
Race / Ethnicity (NH = Non-Hispanic)	Pop 2000	Pop 2010	Pop 2020	% 2000	% 2010	% 2020
White alone (NH)	3,683	4,074	4,158	51.32%	57.38%	54.45%
Black or African American alone (NH)	2,240	1,445	1,204	31.22%	20.35%	15.77%
Native American or Alaska Native alone (NH)	31	31	15	0.43%	0.44%	0.20%
Asian alone (NH)	121	168	247	1.69%	2.37%	3.23%
Native Hawaiian or Pacific Islander alone (NH)	57	31	64	0.79%	0.44%	0.84%
Other race alone (NH)	45	9	40	0.63%	0.13%	0.52%
Mixed race or Multiracial (NH)	249	402	632	3.47%	5.66%	8.28%
Hispanic or Latino (any race)	750	940	1,277	10.45%	13.24%	16.72%
Total	7,176	7,100	7,637	100.00%	100.00%	100.00%

At the 2020 census (some information from the 2022 American Community Survey), 7,637 people, 2,107 housing units, and 1,810 households were residing in the CDP. The population density was 862.9 inhabitants per square mile (333.2/km^{2}). The average housing unit density was 238.1/sq mi (91.9/km^{2}). The racial makeup of the CDP was 58.83% White, 16.32% African American, 0.50% Native American, 3.42% Asian, 0.88% Pacific Islander, 4.49% from other races, and 15.57% from two or more races. Hispanics or Latinos of any race were 16.72% of the population.

Of the households, 86.6% were married couple families, 2.8% were a male family householder with no spouse, and 9.8% were a female family householder with no spouse. The average family household had 4.21 people.

The median age was 19.5, 48.0% of people were under 18, and 0.1% were 65 or older. The largest ancestry is the 13.2% who had Irish ancestry, 9.5% spoke a language other than English at home, and 3.7% were born outside the United States, 70.7% of whom were naturalized citizens.

The median income for a household in the CDP was $97,290 and for a family was $97,101; 19.9% of the population were military veterans and 51.5% had a bachelor's degree or higher. In the CDP, 4.8% of the population were below the poverty line, including 5.2% of those under 18 and none 65 or over, with 0.5% of the population without health insurance.

== Climate ==
The climate in this area is characterized by hot, humid summers and generally mild to cool winters. According to the Köppen climate classification, Fort Belvoir has a humid subtropical climate, Cfa on climate maps.

== Education ==
Dependent children living on post are assigned to schools of the Fairfax County Public Schools district. Two schools in proximity to the base, Fort Belvoir Elementary School and Woodlawn Elementary School, take on-post dependent children. The area middle and high schools are Walt Whitman Middle School and Mount Vernon High School.

== Notable people ==
- Jackson Miles Abbott, United States Army officer, birdwatcher, painter
- Jesse Burch, actor
- Robert T. Connor, former borough president of Staten Island
- Wayne Cordeiro, minister
- Al Davis, football executive
- John Driscoll, actor
- John Ebersole, educator
- Timothy Flanigan, businessman and politician
- Gregory D. Gadson, soldier, actor, and motivational speaker
- Dick Groat, baseball player
- Larry Izzo, football player and coach
- Kenneth Kronholm, soccer player
- Hal Linden, actor
- Leslie Marx, Olympic fencer
- Patrick Ness, author
- William Oefelein, astronaut
- John Lynch Phillips, astronaut
- David Rabe, playwright
- Ahtyba Rubin, football player
- Rolf Saxon, actor
- Bob Uecker, sports personality
- John Wasdin, baseball player
- Christopher Evan Welch, actor
- Randy Wiles, baseball player
- Bill Willingham, comic-book writer and artist
