= List of mid-air collisions =

This is a list of notable accidents and incidents involving mid-air collisions.

In aviation, a mid-air collision is an accident in which two or more aircraft come into unplanned contact during flight. Owing to the relatively high velocities involved and the likelihood of subsequent impact with the ground or sea, very severe damage or the total destruction of at least one of the aircraft usually results.

The potential for a mid-air collision is increased by miscommunication, mistrust, error in navigation, deviations from flight plans, lack of situational awareness, and the lack of traffic collision-avoidance systems. Although a rare occurrence in general due to the vastness of open space available, collisions often happen near or at airports, where large volumes of aircraft are spaced more closely than in general flight.

== Involving civilians ==
Date	Fatalities (Note: All deaths directly attributable to the collision are counted as fatalities.)	Survivors (Note: In general, only occupants of an aircraft directly involved in the mid-air collision are counted as survivors. Bystanders who received nonfatal or no injuries, such as airshow spectators, participants in a military exercise, occupants of nearby noninvolved aircraft, and/or airport ground crew, are not included unless their involvement in the incident is particularly notable.)	Flights involved	Phase of flight	Country	Site
April 7, 1922	7	0	CGEA Farman F.60 / Daimler Hire Ltd. de Havilland DH.18A	492 ft (150 m)	France	Picardy
April 21, 1929	6	0	Maddux Airlines Ford 5-AT-B Trimotor / US Army Air Corps Boeing PW-9D)	2,000 ft (610 m)	United States	San Diego, California
May 18, 1935	45	0	Tupolev ANT-20 Maxim Gorky VVS Polikarpov I-5	Cruise	Russian SFSR, Soviet Union	Moscow
August 24, 1938	5 + 80 ground fatalities		Japanese Flying School (Hanriot HD-1) and Japan Airlines Transportation (Fokker Super Universal)	Unknown	Japan	Ōmori, Tokyo
October 23, 1942	12	2	American Airlines Flight 28 / US Army Air Force B-34	Ascent/descent (9,000 ft (2,700 m))	United States	Chino Canyon, California
July 12, 1945	3	20	Eastern Airlines Flight 45 / US Army Air Force A-26 Invader	Descent	United States	Florence, South Carolina
April 22, 1947	9	0	Delta Air Lines Survey (Douglas DC-3C) / Vultee BT-13 Valiant	Descent	United States	Muscogee County Airport
April 5, 1948	15	0	British European Airways Vickers VC.1 Viking / Soviet Air Force Yakovlev Yak-3 fighter	Approach	Germany	RAF Gatow, Berlin
July 4, 1948	39	0	Scandinavian Airlines System DC-6 / RAF Avro York	Descent	United Kingdom	Northwood, London
January 30, 1949	2	33	Pan Am Flight 100 (Lockheed L-749 Constellation) / Cessna 140	Climb	United States	Port Washington, New York
February 19, 1949	14	0	BEA Douglas Dakota / RAF Avro Anson	Cruise	United Kingdom	Exhall
November 1, 1949	55	1	Eastern Air Lines 537 / Lockheed P-38 test flight	Approach	United States	Washington, DC
April 25, 1951	43	0	Cubana de Aviación 493 / US Navy flight	Cruise/climb	United States	Key West, Florida
June 28, 1952	2	60	American Airlines Flight 910 / private Temco Swift	Approach	United States	Dallas, Texas
April 8, 1954	37	0	Trans-Canada Airlines Flight 9 / RCAF Harvard	Cruise	Canada	Moose Jaw, Saskatchewan
January 12, 1955	15	0	TWA Flight 694 / Private DC-3	Climb	United States	Boone County, Kentucky
June 30, 1956	128	0	UA Flight 718 / TWA Flight 2	Cruise	United States	Grand Canyon, Arizona
January 31, 1957	8	0	Douglas Aircraft Company DC-7B / Northrop F-89J Scorpion	Cruise	United States	Pacoima, Los Angeles, California
April 21, 1958	49	0	United Air Lines Flight 736 / USAF F-100 Super Sabre	Cruise	United States	Las Vegas, Nevada
May 20, 1958	13	1	Capital Airlines Flight 300 / Air National Guard flight	Descent	United States	Brunswick, Maryland
October 22, 1958	31	1	British European Airways Flight 142 / Italian Air Force F-86 Sabre jet fighter	Descent	Italy	Near Anzio
February 25, 1960	61	3	Real Transportes Aéreos DC-3 / US Navy R6D flight	Descent	Brazil	Rio de Janeiro
May 19, 1960	1	38	Air Algérie Sud Aviation SE210 Caravelle 1A / Stampe SV.4	Approach	France	Paris-Orly
December 16, 1960	134	0	UA Flight 826 / TWA Flight 266	Descent	United States	New York City
February 1, 1963	104	0	MEA Flight 265 / Turkish Air Force flight	Descent	Turkey	Ankara
February 17, 1964	2	1	3 MiG-15 of Czechoslovak Air Force	Military training	Czechoslovakia	Hrochův Týnec
December 4, 1965	4	108	TWA Flight 42 / Eastern Airlines Flight 853	Descent	United States	Carmel, New York
March 9, 1967	26	0	TWA Flight 553 / Private flight	Descent	United States	Urbana, Ohio
July 19, 1967	82	0	Piedmont Airlines Flight 22 / Lanseair Inc. flight	Climb/descent	United States	Hendersonville, North Carolina,
March 27, 1968	2	49	Ozark Air Lines Flight 965 / Private flight	Approach	United States	St. Louis, Missouri
August 4, 1968	3	12	North Central Airlines Flight 261 / Private flight	Descent/Cruise	United States	Wind Lake, Wisconsin
June 23, 1969	120	0	Aeroflot Flight 831/ Soviet Air Force flight	Cruise	Soviet Union	Yukhnovsky District
September 9, 1969	83	0	Allegheny Airlines Flight 853 / Private flight	Descent	United States	Fairland, Indiana
September 20, 1969	77	4	Air Vietnam Douglas C-54 / USAF F-4E Phantom II	Approach	South Vietnam	Da Nang Air Base
June 6, 1971	50	1	Hughes Airwest Flight 706 / F-4 Phantom	Climb	United States	San Gabriel Mountains, California
July 30, 1971	162	1	ANA Flight 58 / JASDF flight	Cruise	Japan	near Shizukuishi
August 4, 1971	0	98	Continental Airlines Flight 712 / Private Flight	3,950 ft (1,200 m)	United States	Compton, California
June 29, 1972	13	0	North Central Airlines Flight 290 / Air Wisconsin Flight 671	Cruise	United States	Lake Winnebago, Wisconsin
July 29, 1972	38	0	Avianca Flight 630 / Avianca Flight 626	Cruise	Colombia	Near Las Palomas
March 5, 1973	68	107	Iberia Flight 504 / Spantax Flight 400	Cruise	France	near Nantes
August 9, 1974	3	0	RAF Phantom FGR2 / Piper Pawnee crop duster	Low level	United Kingdom	Fordham Fen, Norfolk
November 1, 1974	38	0	Antonov An-2 / Mil Mi-8	Approach	Soviet Union	Near Surgut, Soviet Union
January 9, 1975	14	0	Golden West Airlines Flight 261 / Private flight	Climb	United States	near Whittier, California
September 9, 1976	70	0	Aeroflot Flight 31 / Aeroflot Flight 7957	Cruise	Soviet Union	near Anapa, Russian SFSR
September 10, 1976	176	0	British Airways Flight 476 / Inex-Adria Flight 550	Cruise	Yugoslavia	near Zagreb, SR Croatia
September 25, 1978	144	0	PSA Flight 182 / Private flight	Descent	United States	San Diego, California
August 11, 1979	178	0	Aeroflot Flight 7628 / Aeroflot Flight 7880	Cruise	Soviet Union	Dniprodzerzhynsk, Ukrainian SSR
July 28, 1981	3	1	Transporte Aéreo Rioplatense CL-44 / Soviet Air Force Sukhoi Su-15	Cruise	Soviet Union	Yerevan, ASSR
August 24, 1981	37	1	Aeroflot Flight 811 / Soviet Air Force Tupolev Tu-16K	Cruise	Soviet Union	Zavitinsk, Russian SFSR,
April 18, 1984	19	16	Two VOTEC Servicios Aéreos Regionais Flights	Approach	Brazil	Near Imperatriz Airport
August 24, 1984	17	0	Wings West Airlines Flight 628 / Rockwell Commander 112	Descent/climb	United States	Near San Luis Obispo, California
May 3, 1985	94	0	Aeroflot Flight SSSR-65856 / Soviet Air Force Antonov An-26	Descent	Soviet Union	Zolochev, Ukrainian SSR
June 18, 1986	25	0	Grand Canyon Airlines Flight 6 / Private helicopter flight	Low level	United States	Grand Canyon
August 31, 1986	82	0	Aeroméxico Flight 498 / Private flight	Descent/climb	United States	Cerritos, California
January 15, 1987	10	0	SkyWest Airlines Flight 1834 / Private flight	Approach	United States	Kearns, Utah
August 28, 1988	3 + 67 ground fatalities	0	3 Aermacchi MB-339PAN of the Frecce Tricolori	Air show	Germany	Ramstein Air Base
April 9, 1990	2	7	ASA Flight 2254 / Private flight	Climb/descent	United States	Gadsden, Alabama
April 4, 1991	5 + 2 ground fatalities	0	Lycoming Air Piper Aerostar / Sun Oil Company Bell 412	Low level	United States	Merion, Pennsylvania
December 22, 1992	157	2	Libyan Arab Airlines Flight 1103 / Libyan Air Force MiG-23 jet fighter	Approach	Libya	Tripoli
February 8, 1993	133	0	Iran Air Tours Tupolev Tu-154M / Iranian Air Force Sukhoi Su-24	Climb/approach	Iran	Tehran
November 26, 1993	4	0	NZ Police Eagle / NZ Police traffic patrol	Low level	New Zealand	Auckland
November 12, 1996	349	0	Saudia Flight 763 / Kazakhstan Airlines Flight 1907	Climb/descent	India	Charkhi Dadri
July 30, 1998	15	0	Proteus Airlines Flight 706 / Private flight	Low level	Quiberon Bay, France	
February 8, 2000	3	0	Zlin 242L / Cessna 172	Descent	United States	Zion, Illinois
July 1, 2002	71	0	Bashkirian Airlines Flight 2937 / DHL Flight 611	Cruise	Germany	Überlingen
January 18, 2005	1	2	Air Tractor AT-502B / US Air Force Cessna T-37B	Cruise	United States	Hollister, Oklahoma
September 29, 2006	154	7	Gol Transportes Aéreos Flight 1907 / ExcelAire flight	Cruise	Brazil	Amazon rainforest
March 5, 2007	8	0	Aérospatiale SA 332 Super Puma / private Diamond DV20 Katana	Low level	Austria	Zell am See Airport
July 27, 2007	4	0	KNXV-TV news helicopter / KTVK news helicopter	Low level	United States	Phoenix, Arizona
September 1, 2007	2	0	Two Zlin Z-526Fs of the AZL Żelazny	Aerobatic display	Poland	Near Radom
August 8, 2009	9	0	Piper PA-32 / Eurocopter AS350 helicopter	Low level	United States	Hudson River, New York
September 20, 2012	4	200	Syrian Arab Airlines Flight RB-501 / Syrian Air Force Mil Mi-8 helicopter	Climb	Syria	Damascus
November 2, 2013	0	11	Cessna 182L / Cessna 185F	Cruise	United States	Superior, Wisconsin
October 23, 2014	3	2	Cirrus SR22 / Robinson R44 II	Approach/Climb	United States	Frederick, Maryland
March 9, 2015	10	0	Two Eurocopter AS350 helicopters	Climb	Argentina	La Rioja Province
July 7, 2015	2	1	USAF F-16 / Cessna 150	Approach / Climb	United States	Moncks Corner, South Carolina
September 5, 2015	7	112	Ceiba Intercontinental Airlines Flight 71 / Senegalair business jet	Cruise	Senegal	Eastern
September 23, 2017	0	3	Piper PA-28 Cherokee / Robinson R22	Landing	United States	Clearwater Air Park
May 13, 2019	6	10	Mountain Air Service DHC-2 / Taquan Air DHC-3	Descent	United States	George Inlet, Alaska
July 31, 2020	7	0	de Havilland DHC-2 Beaver / Piper PA-12	Climb	United States	Soldotna, Alaska
May 12, 2021	0	3	Key Lime Air Flight 970 / Private Cirrus SR22 flight	Approach	United States	Arapahoe County, Colorado
July 17, 2022	4	0	Piper PA-46 Malibu / Cessna 172	Approach	United States	North Las Vegas, Nevada
September 17, 2022	3	0	Cessna 172 / Sonex Xenos	Cruise	United States	Longmont, Boulder County, Colorado
September 24, 2022	2	0	Zlín Z-526 / Zlín Z-526	Aerobatic display	Germany	Gera
January 2, 2023	4	9	Two Eurocopter EC130 helicopters	Climb/descent	Australia	Gold Coast Seaway, Queensland
January 6, 2023	2	0	Air Tractor AT-504 / AT-502	Aerobatic display	Panama	Guabito, Changuinola district
March 7, 2023	4	0	Piper PA28-161 Cadet / Piper J-3 Cub	Climb/Descent	United States	Winter Haven, Florida
March 5, 2024	2	44	De Havilland Canada Dash 8 / Cessna 172	Climb/Approach	Kenya	Nairobi National Park
June 2, 2024	1	1	Yakovlev Yak-52 / Yakovlev Yak-52	Descent	Portugal	Beja, Alentejo Region
June 14, 2024	1	1	Air Tractor AT-502B / Air Tractor 502-B	Cruise	United States	Near Whiteface, Texas
June 20, 2024	1	1	Air Tractor AT-802 / Air Tractor AT-502B	Cruise	United States	Arco, Idaho
July 11, 2024	1	1	Air Tractor AT-802A / Air Tractor AT-502B	Cruise	United States	Near Bonita, Louisiana
July 25, 2024	2	0	Robinson R22 Beta / Robinson R22 Beta	Approach	Australia	Mount Anderson Station near Camballin, Western Australia
October 26, 2024	3	0	Cessna 182 / Jabiru UL-450	Cruise	Australia	Belimbla Park, New South Wales
January 29, 2025	67	0	American Eagle Flight 5342 / U.S. Army Sikorsky UH-60 Black Hawk helicopter	Approach	United States	Ronald Reagan Washington National Airport, United States
February 19, 2025	2	2	Lancair 360 MK II / Cessna 172	Cruise	United States	Marana Regional Airport, United States
May 17, 2025	5	0	Robinson R44 / Robinson R44	Cruise	Finland	Eura
July 8, 2025	2	0	Cessna 172 / Cessna 152	Approach	Canada	Steinbach, Manitoba
August 31, 2025	1	3	Extra EA-300/LC / Cessna 172M Skyhawk II	Approach	United States	Fort Morgan Municipal Airport
October 4, 2025	2	2	Cessna R172K Hawk XP / Cessna 172Q Cutlass	En route	Bolivia	Near Santa Ana del Yacuma
June 14, 2026	6	0	Eurocopter AS350 Écureuil / Bell 206	Unknown	Brazil	Recreio dos Bandeirantes, Rio de Janeiro

== Purely military ==
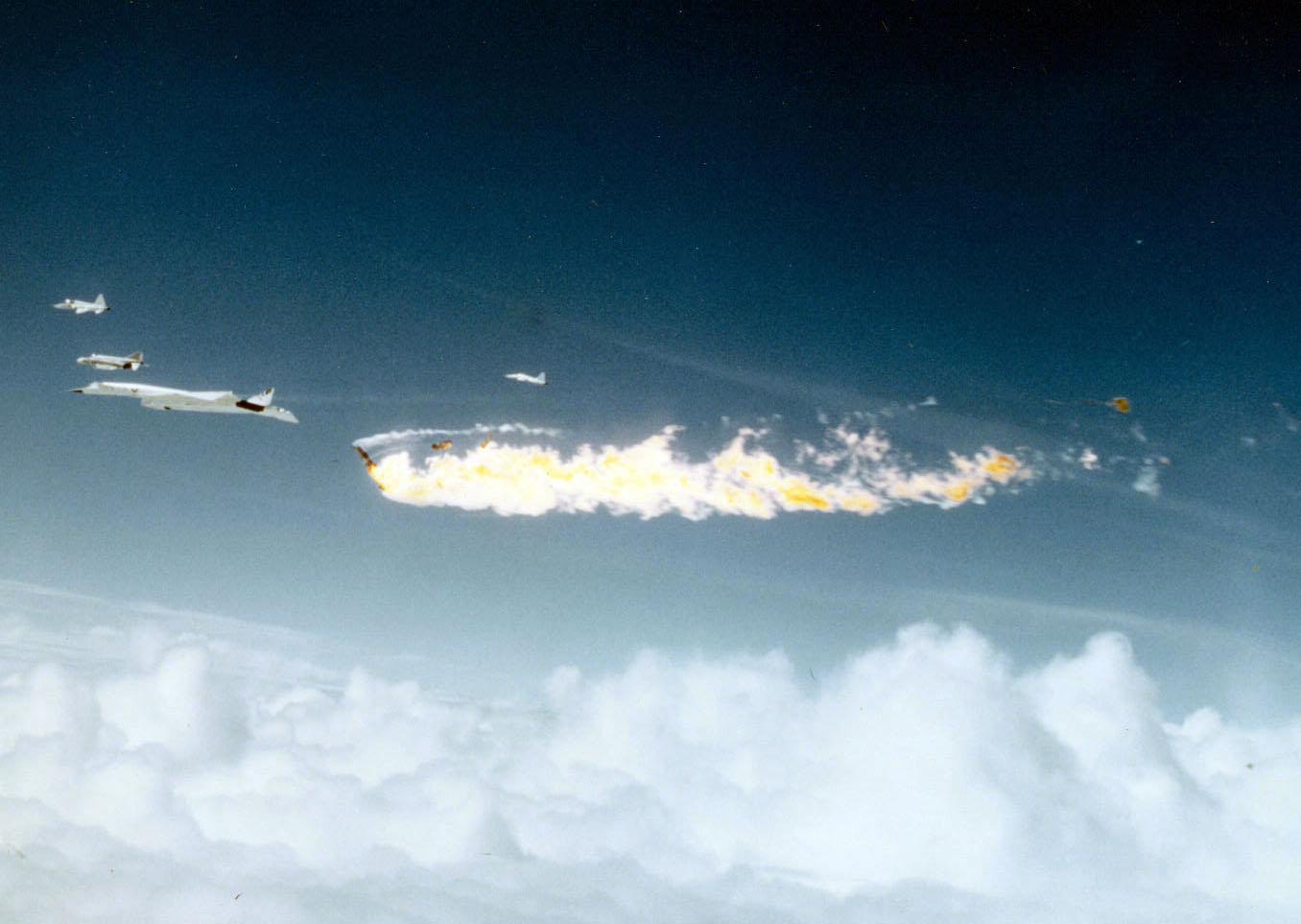
XB-70 Valkyrie 62-0207 following the mid-air collision on 8 June 1966: The XB-70 can be seen at the far left of the image, missing one of its vertical stabilizers, while the large fireball is the F-104 Starfighter with which it collided.

Date	Fatalities	Survivors	Aircraft involved	Site
September 29, 1940	0	4	Two Avro Ansons of the RAAF	Brocklesby, New South Wales, Australia
January 15, 1953	26	0	RAF Vickers Valetta / RAF Avro Lancaster	Mediterranean Sea near Sicily
August 11, 1955	66	0	Two USAF C-119 Flying Boxcars	near Stuttgart, Germany
February 5, 1958	0	4	USAF B-47 Stratojet / USAF F-86 Sabre	Tybee Island, Georgia, U.S.
June 15, 1965	18	0	Two U.S. Army UH-1D Iroquoises	Fort Benning, Georgia, U.S.
January 17, 1966	7	4	USAF B-52G Stratofortress / USAF KC-135 Stratotanker	Mediterranean Sea near Palomares, Almería, Spain
April 12, 1973	16	1	NASA Convair C-990 Coronado / US Navy P-3 Orion	Moffett Field, Sunnyvale, U.S.
May 1, 1983	0	3	Israeli Air Force F-15 Eagle / A-4 Skyhawk	Negev, Israel
December 1, 1992	13	0	Two C-141B Starlifter	North Central Montana, U.S.
March 23, 1994	24 (Note: All ground fatalities, refer to main article.)	7	F-16 Fighting Falcon / C-130 Hercules	Pope Air Force Base, North Carolina, U.S.
February 4, 1997	73	0	Two IAF Sikorsky CH-53 helicopters	She'ar Yashuv, Israel
September 13, 1997	33	0	USAF C-141B Starlifter / German Air Force Tupolev Tu-154M	Off the coast of Namibia
September 3, 1998	12	0	2 USAF HH-60G Pavehawk	Nevada Test & Training Range
April 1, 2001	1	24	USN Lockheed EP-3E / PLAN Shenyang J-8II	South China Sea near Hainan Island, PRC
August 16, 2009	1	1	Two Sukhoi Su-27s of the Russian Knights	Moscow, Russia
October 30, 2009	9	0	USCG C-130 / USMC Cobra Helicopter	Off the coast of California, U.S.
March 1, 2011	1	1	Two SLAF IAI Kfir	Yakkala, Gampaha, Sri Lanka
September 11, 2013	1	1	Two SEPECAT Jaguar	Rakhyut, Oman
June 23, 2014	2	1	Learjet 35A / Eurofighter Typhoon	Olsberg, Germany
December 6, 2018	6	2	KC-130J Hercules / F/A-18 Hornet	Iwakuni, Japan
November 25, 2019	13	0	French Armed Forces Eurocopter Tiger / Eurocopter AS532 Cougar	Ménaka, Ménaka Region, Mali
November 12, 2022	6	0	B-17 Flying Fortress / Bell P-63 Kingcobra	Dallas, Texas, U.S.
January 28, 2023	1	2	Sukhoi Su-30 MKI / Dassault Mirage 2000H	Near Morena, Madhya Pradesh, India
March 29, 2023	9	0	2 HH-60 Blackhawk Helicopers	Fort Campbell, Kentucky, U.S.
April 27, 2023	3	1	Two AH-64 Apache	Healy, Alaska, U.S.
July 1, 2023	1	1	Two T-27 Tucano	Villavicencio, Meta, Colombia
August 25, 2023	3	?	Two L-39 Albatros	Zhytomyr oblast, Ukraine
April 20, 2024	8	0	Two Mitsubishi SH-60K	Near Tori-shima Island, Izu Islands, Japan
April 23, 2024	10	0	AgustaWestland AW139 / Eurocopter Fennec	RMN Lumut Naval Base, Lumut, Perak, Malaysia
March 7, 2025	2	0	Two SIAI-Marchetti S.208	Guidonia, Lazio, Italy
March 12, 2026	6	0	Two Boeing KC-135 Stratotanker	Over western Iraq
May 17, 2026	0	4	Two Boeing EA-18G Growler	Mountain Home Air Force Base, Idaho, U.S.

== See also ==
- Plane crash
- List of mid-air collisions and incidents in the United Kingdom
