= Scud (disambiguation) =

Scud refers to a series of tactical ballistic missiles developed by the Soviet Union during the Cold War.

Scud or SCUD may also refer to:

- Scud (crustacean), a genus of amphipods, shrimplike aquatic animals
- Scud (dog), a character in the animation Toy Story
- Scud FM, nickname of BBC Radio 4's continuous 1991 Gulf War news service
- Scud Mountain Boys, an American country music band

== Acronym ==
- Septicemic cutaneous ulcerative disease, a disease found in turtles
- Socle pour le changement, l'unité et la démocratie, a Chadian rebel group

== Aviation and meteorology ==
- Scud (cloud), scattered cumulus under deck
- Scud running, flying at a reduced altitude to avoid clouds

=== Gliders ===
- Abbott-Baynes Scud 1
- Abbott-Baynes Scud 2
- Abbott-Baynes Scud 3

== Comics and games ==
- Scud: The Disposable Assassin, a science fiction comic book series
- Scud: The Disposable Assassin (video game), a Sega Saturn game based on the comic book series
- Scud Race, a Sega arcade racing game

== People ==
- Scud (filmmaker), working name of Danny Cheng Wan-Cheung
- Scud, a fictional character in the film Blade II
- Scud Stud, nickname of British journalist Rageh Omaar
- The Scud, nickname of Australian tennis player Mark Philippoussis
- The Scud Stud, nickname of Canadian journalist Arthur Kent

== Places ==
- Scud River, a river in British Columbia near associated Scud Glacier and Scud Mountain
