= Ozark Air Lines Flight 965 =

1968 mid-air collision in St. Louis, Missouri

Accident
- Date: March 27, 1968
- Summary: Mid-air collision
- Site: St. Louis, Missouri; 38°45′N 90°22′W
- Total fatalities: 2
- Total survivors: 49

First aircraft
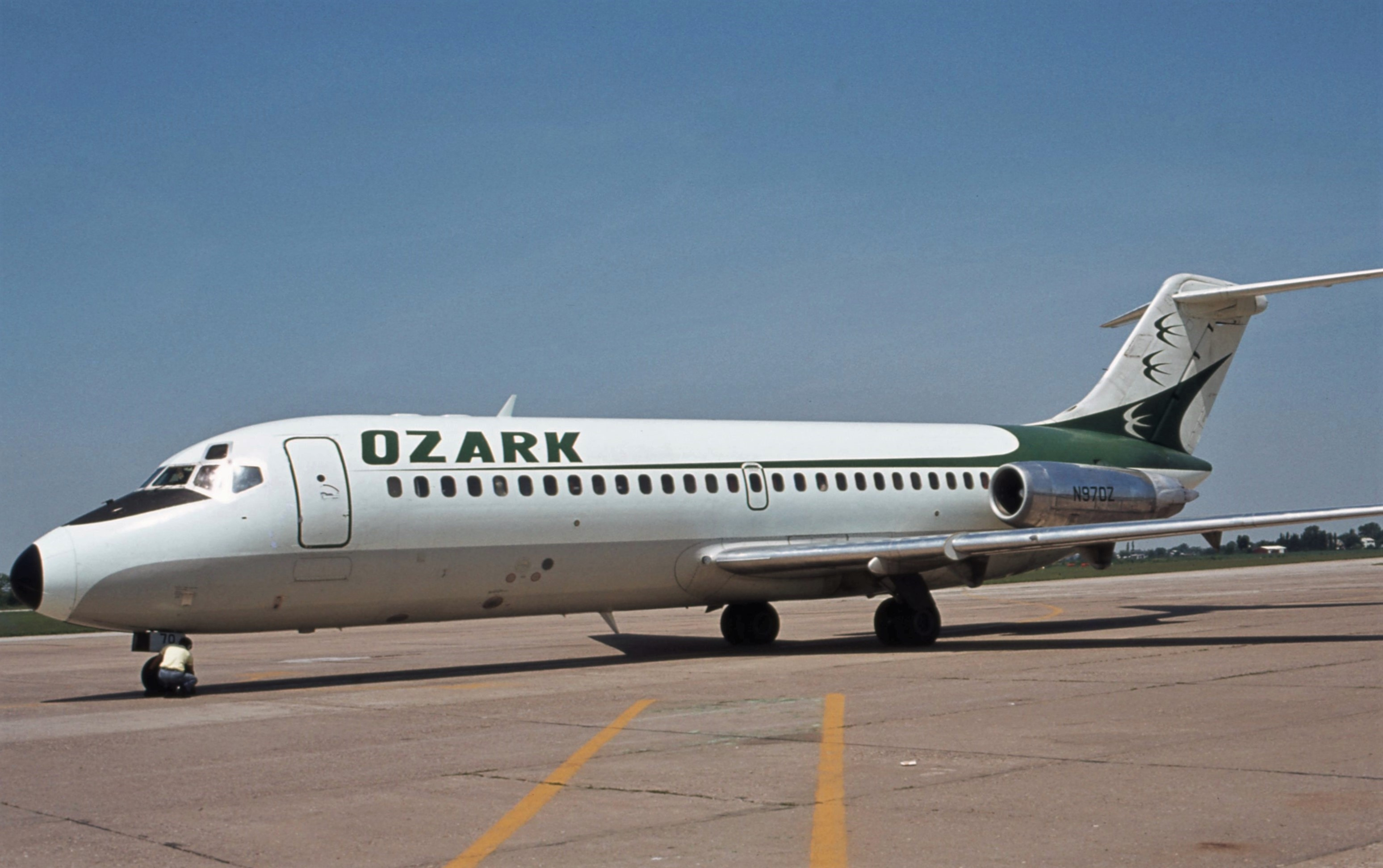
- N970Z, the Douglas DC-9-15 involved, in 1980
- Type: Douglas DC-9-15
- Operator: Ozark Air Lines
- IATA flight No.: OZ965
- ICAO flight No.: OZA965
- Call sign: OZARK 965
- Registration: N970Z
- Flight origin: Chicago, Illinois, U.S.
- Stopover: Greater Peoria Regional Airport, Illinois
- Destination: Lambert Field, Missouri, U.S.
- Occupants: 49
- Passengers: 44
- Crew: 5
- Fatalities: 0
- Survivors: 49

Second aircraft
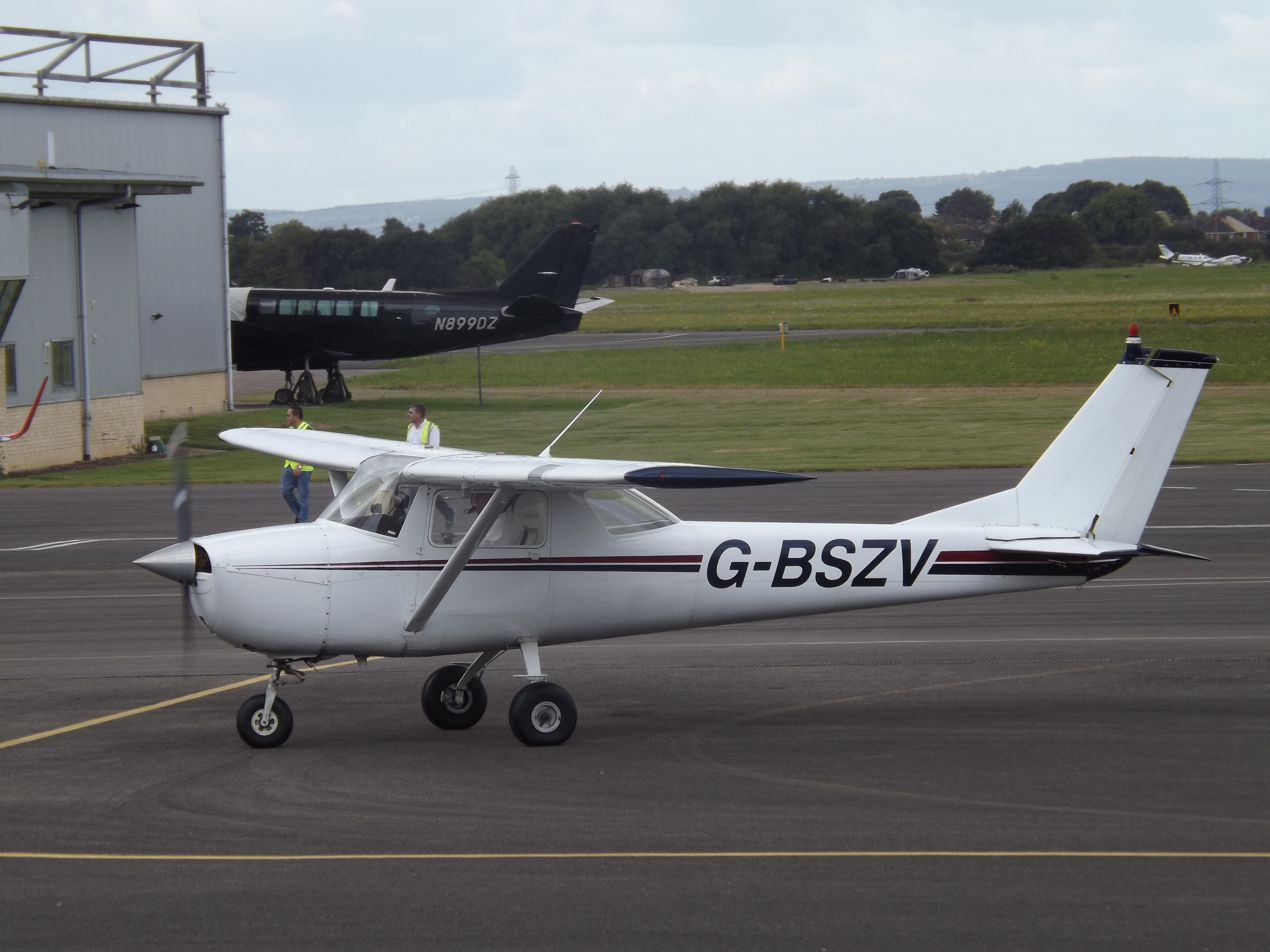
- A Cessna 150F similar to the accident aircraft
- Type: Cessna 150F
- Operator: Interstate Airmotive, Inc.
- Registration: N8669G
- Flight origin: Lambert Field
- Destination: Lambert Field
- Occupants: 2
- Crew: 2
- Fatalities: 2
- Survivors: 0

Ozark Air Lines Flight 965 was a scheduled commercial flight from Chicago, Illinois, to Lambert Field in St. Louis, Missouri, with a scheduled intermediate stopover at Greater Peoria Regional Airport in Peoria, Illinois. On March 27, 1968, the Douglas DC-9-15 jetliner operating the flight, carrying 44 passengers and five crew, collided in mid-air with a single-engined Cessna 150F while both aircraft were on approach to the same runway at Lambert Field. The DC-9 landed safely with no injuries to any of its 49 occupants, while both pilots in the two-person Cessna died in the collision and subsequent ground impact.

== Aircraft and crew ==
The first accident aircraft was a Douglas DC-9-15, registered N970Z, manufacturer's serial number 45772, manufactured on May 5, 1966, and owned and operated by Ozark Air Lines. At the time of the accident, it had a total time of 5,172 hours. There were three pilots aboard the flight: Captain R.J. Fitch, aged 52, had accumulated 24,127 flight hours, including 800 in the DC-9; First Officer W.C. Oltman, aged 43, had accumulated 9,805 flight hours, including 1,188 in the DC-9; and Captain R.W. Traub, aged 46, had accumulated 18,402 flight hours, including 51 in the DC-9. All three pilots held an airline transport pilot certificate and a first-class medical certificate. Oltman was the pilot flying and was seated in the right-hand seat. (Note: The DC-9 is normally flown by two pilots and is equipped with only two sets of flight controls, but the NTSB report does not explicitly state whether Fitch or Traub was acting as pilot in command, nor who was seated in the left-hand seat. The report implies that the third pilot was sitting in the cockpit, presumably in the jump seat, as an "observer".) The aircraft was carrying 44 passengers and a cabin crew of two flight attendants. The aircraft was equipped with a cockpit voice recorder (CVR) and a flight data recorder (FDR) that were functioning properly at the time of the accident.

The second accident aircraft was a Cessna 150F, registered N8669G, manufacturer's serial number 15062769, owned and operated by Interstate Airmotive, Inc., a flight school. At the time of the accident, it had a total time of 1,392 hours. Two pilots were aboard: instructor B.L. Allen, age 31, who had about 381 flight hours, and was a certified flight instructor; and trainee John Brooks, age 34, who held a commercial pilot certificate and had about 174 flight hours. The aircraft was not carrying, nor was it required to carry, a CVR or an FDR.

== Accident ==
At 5:49 p.m., Ozark Air Lines Flight 965, was en route to Lambert Field and was transferred to St. Louis Approach Control. It was daylight and clear weather conditions prevailed, with high, thin, broken clouds and 15 mi (24 km) visibility reported, but surface winds were strong, bearing 170° at 15–20 knots (17–23 mph; 28–37 km/h). The DC-9 pilots initiated an instrument approach to runway 12R, but before reaching the outer marker, they reported to approach control that they had the airport in sight. At 5:55 p.m., approach control cleared the pilots for a contact approach to runway 17, (Note: This runway no longer exists at Lambert Field.) which the pilots acknowledged, and the controller transferred the flight to the airport control tower. The pilots made a left turn. At 5:56 p.m., the pilots reported to the tower that they were on a right base leg for runway 17, and the controller advised them of Cessna N8669G ahead and to the right. The pilots did not respond to the controller regarding the traffic advisory, but the CVR recorded one pilot saying "I don't see it (out there) at all", to which another replied "Naw."

Cessna N8669G was on a visual flight rules (VFR) instructional flight and the pilots contacted the tower for landing instructions. After making numerous calls to other aircraft, the controller instructed the Cessna pilots to "report right downwind" (referring to a downwind airfield traffic pattern turn). The controller then called Ozark 965 to confirm it was following a different Cessna. Spotting Cessna N8669G near the DC-9, the controller then said, "Six nine golf (Note: ICAO phonetic alphabet representing the last three characters in the Cessna's aircraft registration, 69G.) if that's you out there about to turn final pull out to your- ah - well just proceed straight on across the final and enter on a left base leg for runway one seven. You'll be following an Ozark DC-9, turning final about two [miles] out, maybe to your left and above you, you have him?" The Cessna pilot replied, "Six nine golf roger."

A few seconds later at 5:57 p.m., a tower controller called Ozark 965 again with a second traffic advisory, saying "that Cessna off to your right looks like he's eastbound." All three pilots looked to their right and spotted Cessna N8669G directly abeam the DC-9 cockpit. The captain attempted to dodge the small aircraft but heard and felt a thump of impact. The impact and subsequent uncontrolled descent severed the right wing of the Cessna; the main wreckage and left wing were found in an empty parking lot 6,500 ft (2,000 m) from the approach end of runway 17. The National Transportation Safety Board (NTSB) characterized the crash as "nonsurvivable". The DC-9 remained controllable and landed on runway 17 without serious incident. It sustained light damage to the right wing and a wing flap, with paint smears consistent with contact with the Cessna's propeller and wing.

== Investigation ==
The NTSB initiated an investigation of the accident and issued its final report on June 30, 1969.

There were no published procedures for VFR approaches to Lambert Field; pilots would contact the tower for landing instructions once within 5 miles (4.3 nmi; 8.0 km) of the airport, and tower controllers would sequence the aircraft depending on prevailing traffic conditions. Pilots were expected to "see and avoid" conflicting air traffic. The control tower was equipped with radar, but the scope was designed for nighttime lighting conditions, and was not usable in daylight; hence, tower controllers were using binoculars to visually sequence traffic. VFR traffic and tower controller workload was high at the time; controllers were sequencing VFR flights to land on runway 17 from both directions, and a controller was giving rapid radio instructions to multiple flights, including at least two other Cessnas using runway 17, one of which was landing ahead of both accident aircraft.

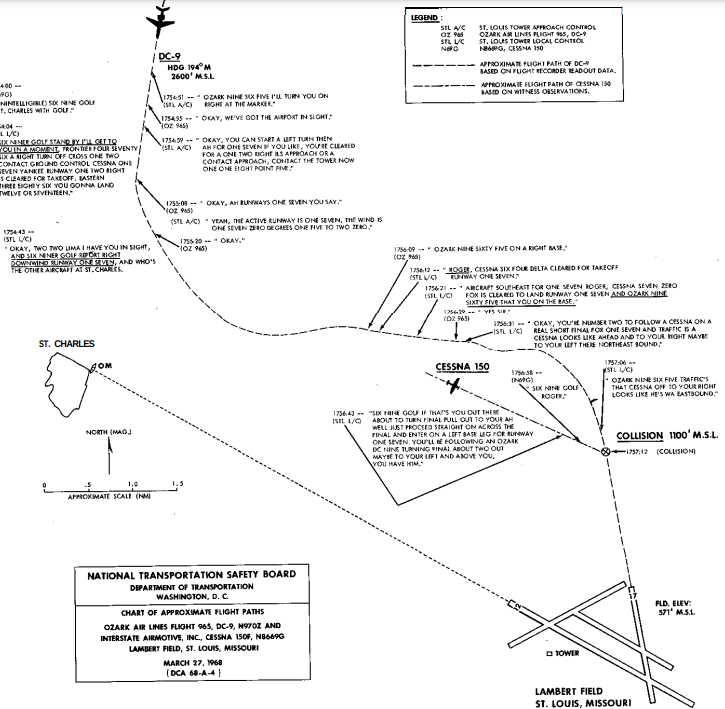
The flight paths of both flights (with dialogue)

The NTSB reconstructed the flight paths of both accident aircraft based on FDR and radar data. This confirmed that the Cessna pilots did not follow the flight path dictated by the controller, having apparently either disregarded or failed to understand the instruction to turn right downwind and report, and instead flew directly into the final approach path for runway 17. The controller was initially unaware that the Cessna pilots had done so, as the Cessna pilots were not reporting their position, he lacked radar information, he was busy sequencing other aircraft, and his vantage point made it difficult to accurately judge the Cessna's position visually.

The NTSB performed a visibility study based on the flight paths of both aircraft, concluding that the Cessna should have been visible to the DC-9 first officer (the pilot flying) for 58 seconds leading to the collision; to the aircraft captain, for 22 seconds; and to the observer (the other captain) for 12 seconds, not counting short periods when the windshield framing might have momentarily obscured the small aircraft. Due to the Cessna's high wing configuration, the DC-9 would have been very difficult for the Cessna pilots to see approaching from above and behind; additionally, the Cessna pilots were likely fixated on turning towards the runway or maintaining separation from the other Cessna landing in front of them, and the controller's radio call suggested to the pilots that Ozark 965 would appear above and to their left, not overtake them from behind.

=== Probable cause ===
The NTSB determined the probable cause of the accident to be: "the inadequacy of current VFR separation standards in controlled airspace, the crew of the DC-9 not sighting the Cessna in time to avoid it, the absence of VFR traffic pattern procedures to enhance an orderly flow of landing aircraft, the local controller not assuring that important landing information issued to the Cessna was received and understood under the circumstances of a heavy traffic situation without radar assistance, and the Cessna crew's deviation from their traffic pattern instructions or their continuation to a critical point in the traffic pattern without informing the local controller of the progress of the flight."

=== Recommendations ===
The NTSB recommended to the Federal Aviation Administration (FAA) that daylight radar display equipment be installed at Lambert Field; that better utilization of radar be made for approaching traffic; and that VFR traffic corridors be established at Lambert Field and similar airports. The FAA responded by installing daylight radar displays, working towards the scheduled implementation of a radar sequencing program, and taking the VFR traffic corridor recommendation under advisement.

== See also ==
- 1984 San Luis Obispo mid-air collision – another accident involving an airline flight and a training flight operating from the same airport
- Safarilink Aviation Flight 053 – 2024 mid-air collision involving an airline flight and a training flight operating from the same airport
