= Flight 53 =

Flight 53 or Flight 053 may refer to:

- Safarilink Aviation Flight 053, involved in a mid-air collision on 5 March 2024
- ADC Airlines Flight 053, crashed on 29 October 2006
