= Pacific Southwest Airlines Flight 182 =

1978 mid-air collision over California

1978 North Park mid-air collision Pacific Southwest Airlines Flight 182 · Gibbs Flite Center, Inc. Flight 7711 GOLF
- Photograph of Flight 182 seconds after colliding with the Cessna 172M

Accident
- Date: September 25, 1978
- Summary: Mid-air collision because of pilot and ATC error
- Site: North Park, near San Diego International Airport, San Diego, California, United States; 32°44′38.2″N 117°07′13.4″W
- Total fatalities: 144
- Total injuries: 9
- Total survivors: 0

First aircraft
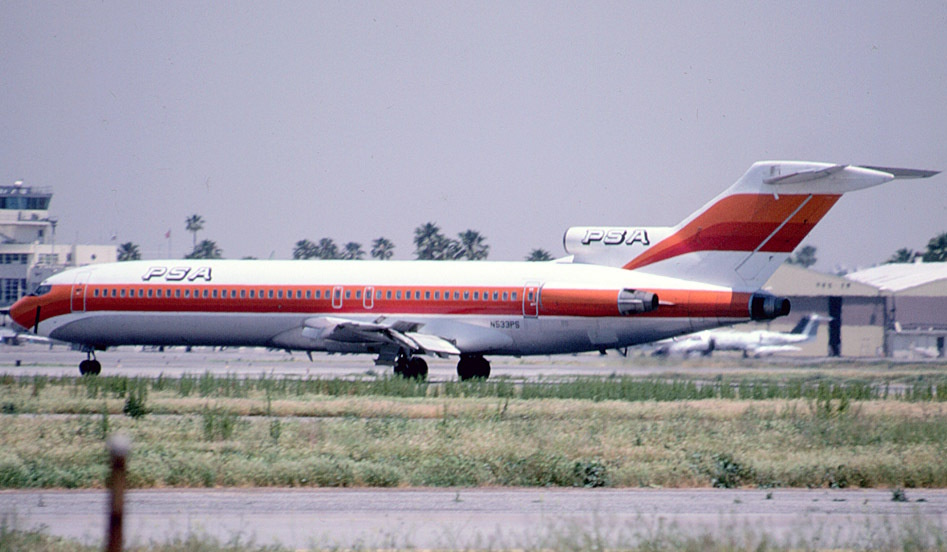
- N533PS, the Boeing 727-214 involved in the collision, pictured in June 1978
- Type: Boeing 727-214
- Operator: Pacific Southwest Airlines
- IATA flight No.: PS182
- ICAO flight No.: PSA182
- Call sign: PSA 182
- Registration: N533PS
- Flight origin: Sacramento International Airport, Sacramento, California, U.S.
- Stopover: Los Angeles International Airport, Los Angeles, California, U.S.
- Destination: San Diego International Airport, San Diego, California, U.S.
- Occupants: 135
- Passengers: 128
- Crew: 7
- Fatalities: 135
- Survivors: 0

Second aircraft
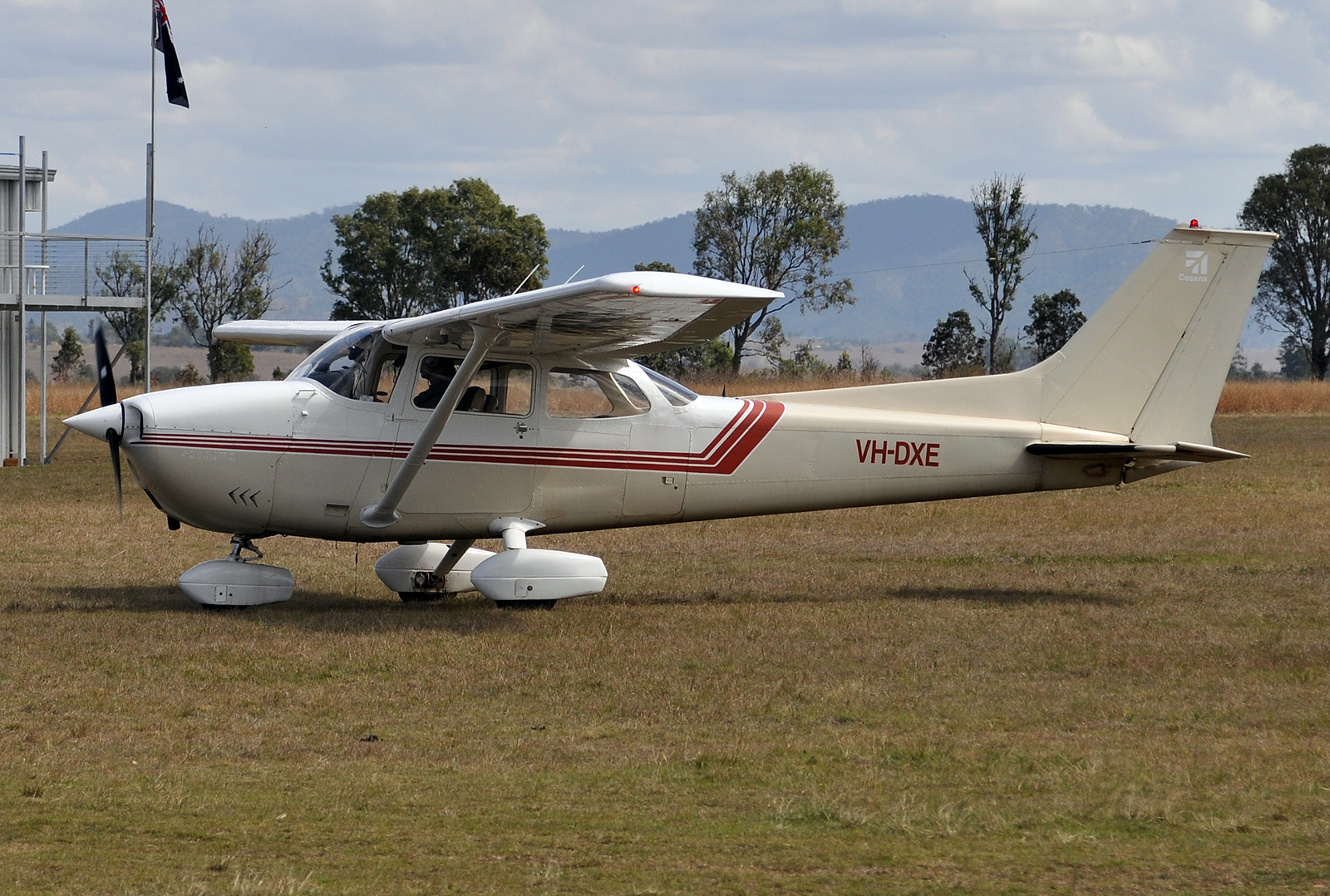
- A Cessna 172M, similar to the one involved in the collision
- Type: Cessna 172M
- Operator: Gibbs Flite Center, Inc.
- Call sign: CESSNA 7711 GOLF
- Registration: N7711G
- Flight origin: Montgomery Field, San Diego, California, U.S.
- Occupants: 2
- Crew: 2
- Fatalities: 2
- Survivors: 0

Ground casualties
- Ground fatalities: 7
- Ground injuries: 9

Pacific Southwest Airlines Flight 182 was a Pacific Southwest Airlines (PSA) flight from Sacramento to San Diego, California with a stopover in Los Angeles. On September 25, 1978, the Boeing 727-214 (Note: The aircraft was a Boeing 727-200 model; Boeing assigns a unique code for each company that buys one of its aircraft, which is applied as a suffix to the model number at the time the aircraft is built, hence "727-214" designates a 727-200 built for Pacific Southwest Airlines (customer code 14).) serving the flight (registration: N533PS) and a private Cessna 172 (light aircraft; N7711G) collided mid-air over San Diego. It was PSA's first fatal accident and it remains the deadliest air disaster in California history. It was the deadliest air crash to occur in the United States until the crash of American Airlines Flight 191 in May 1979. It currently stands as the seventh-deadliest non-intentional crash to occur on American soil. (Note: It is behind American 191 (273), American 587 (265), TWA 800 (230), Korean Air 801 (229), Northwest 255 (156) and Pan Am 759 (153). American 11, United 175, EgyptAir 990 and American 77 are not counted because either they are terrorism-related crashes, or crashed in international waters; otherwise, PSA 182 would be counted as the eleventh-deadliest.)

Following their collision, both the Boeing and the Cessna crashed into North Park, a residential but urban uptown neighborhood located roughly three miles northeast of downtown San Diego. PSA 182 crashed just north of the intersection of Dwight and Nile Streets, killing all 135 people aboard the aircraft along with seven bystanders on the ground or residents in their homes, including two children. The Cessna struck Polk Avenue between 32nd and Iowa Streets, killing the two pilots on board. Nine others on the ground were injured and a total of 22 homes were either destroyed or damaged by the impact and debris.

== Prelude ==
The crash of Flight 182 was preceded by a near-identical incident involving a different PSA Boeing 727 with a different Cessna plane. On January 15, 1969, a PSA Boeing 727-214 (N973PS) had collided with a Cessna 182L (N42242) on ascent from San Francisco International Airport, bound for Ontario International Airport. The 727 continued to Ontario and landed safely, while the Cessna suffered damage on the right wing and returned to San Francisco. (Note: The National Transportation Safety Board concluded that the incident occurred as a result of "[p]ilots in command of each aircraft fail[ing] to see and avoid the other aircraft.")

== Accident ==
On the morning of September 25, 1978, Pacific Southwest Airlines Flight 182 departed Sacramento for San Diego via Los Angeles. The seven-person, San Diego–based crew consisted of captain James E. "Jim" McFeron (42), with 17 years of service at PSA; first officer Robert E. "Bob" Fox (38), with nine years of service; flight engineer Martin J. Wahne (44), with 11 years' service; and four cabin crew including purser Karen Borzewski (29), with 10 years of service, flight attendants Deborah McCarthy (29), with nine years of service, Dee Young (26), with five years of service, Kate Fons (20) and Daniel Jaine (39), with three months of service. Captain McFeron, a veteran pilot with PSA, had accumulated a total of 14,394 flight hours, including 10,482 hours on the 727. First Officer Fox had a total of 10,056 flight hours, including 5,800 hours on the 727. Flight Engineer Wahne had a total of 10,800 flying hours, with 6,587 hours in the 727.

The flight from Sacramento to Los Angeles was uneventful. At 8:34 a.m. PDT, Flight 182 departed Los Angeles, with Fox as the pilot flying. There were 128 passengers on board, including 29 PSA employees. The weather in San Diego was sunny and clear with ten miles (16 km) of visibility.

At 8:59 a.m., the PSA crew was alerted by the approach controller about a small Cessna 172 aircraft nearby. The Cessna was flown by two licensed pilots. Martin Kazy Jr., 32, possessed single-engine, multi-engine and instrument flight ratings, as well as a commercial certificate and an instrument flight instructor certificate. He had flown a total of 5,137 hours. The other pilot, David Boswell, 35, a U.S. Marine Corps gunnery sergeant, possessed single-engine and multi-engine ratings and a commercial certificate. He had flown 407 hours and was practicing instrument landing system approaches under the instruction of Kazy in pursuit of his instrument flight rules (IFR) rating. They had departed from Montgomery Field and were navigating under visual flight rules (VFR), which did not require the filing of a flight plan. Boswell was wearing a training hood to limit his field of vision straight ahead to the cockpit panel, much like an oversized sun visor with vertical panels to block peripheral vision, which is normal in IFR training. At the time of the collision, the Cessna was on a missed approach (in VFR conditions) from Lindbergh Field Runway 9, heading east and climbing. The Cessna was in communication with San Diego approach control.

Abridged communication between PSA 182 and the controllers, and among the PSA flight crew
# = Nonpertinent word; * = Unintelligible word; () = Questionable text; (()) = Commentary; Shading = Radio communication
Time	Source	Content
08:59:30	San Diego approach control	PSA one eighty-two, traffic twelve o'clock, one mile northbound.
08:59:35	Captain (to San Diego approach control)	We're looking.
08:59:39	San Diego approach control	PSA one eighty-two, additional traffic's ah, twelve o'clock, three miles ((five km)) just north of the field, northeast-bound, a Cessna one seventy-two climbing VFR out of one thousand four hundred
08:59:39	Flight engineer	Yeah ((Sound of laughter))
08:59:39	First officer	Very nice
08:59:41	Flight engineer	He really broke up laughing I said so I'm late
08:59:48	((Off-duty captain relays an anecdote until 09:00:10))	
08:59:50	First officer (to San Diego approach control)	Okay we've got that other twelve.
08:59:57	San Diego approach control	Cessna seven seven one one golf, San Diego departure radar contact, maintain VFR conditions at or below three thousand five hundred, fly heading zero seven zero, vector final approach course.
09:00:15	San Diego approach control	PSA one eighty-two, traffic's at twelve o'clock, three miles out of one thousand seven hundred.
09:00:21	First officer	Got 'em.
09:00:22	Captain (to San Diego approach control)	Traffic in sight.
09:00:23	San Diego approach control	Okay, sir, maintain visual separation, contact Lindbergh tower one three three point three, have a nice day now.
09:00:26	First officer	Flaps two.
09:00:28	Captain (to San Diego approach control)	Okay
09:00:34	Captain (to Lindbergh tower)	Lindbergh, PSA one eighty-two downwind.
09:00:38	Lindbergh tower	PSA one eighty-two, Lindbergh tower, ah, traffic twelve o'clock one mile a Cessna.
09:00:41	First officer	Flaps five.
09:00:42	Captain	Is that the one (we're) looking at?
09:00:43	First officer	Yeah, but I don't see him now.
09:00:44	Captain (to Lindbergh tower)	Okay, we had it there a minute ago.
09:00:47	Lindbergh tower	One eighty-two, roger.
09:00:50	Captain (to Lindbergh tower)	I think he's pass(ed) off to our right. ((Due to radio static, Lindbergh tower voice recording reveals tower received "he's passing off to our right".))
09:00:51	Lindbergh tower	Yeah.
09:00:52	Captain	He was right over here a minute ago.
09:00:53	First officer	Yeah.

The PSA pilots reported that they saw the Cessna after being notified of its position by ATC, although cockpit voice recordings revealed that shortly thereafter, the PSA pilots no longer had the Cessna in sight; they were merely speculating about its position. Because of radio static, Lindbergh tower, as per the tower voice recording, received the 09.00:50 transmission as "He's passing off to our right" and assumed that the PSA jet had the Cessna in sight, thus maintaining visual separation.

After receiving permission to land, and about 40 seconds before colliding with the Cessna, the conversation among the four occupants of Flight 182's cockpit (captain, first officer, flight engineer and off-duty PSA captain Spencer Nelson, who was riding in the cockpit's jump seat) was as follows, showing the confusion:

# = Nonpertinent word * = Unintelligible word () = Questionable text (()) = Commentary
Time	Source	Content
09:01:07	Lindbergh tower	PSA one eighty-two, cleared to land.
09:01:08	Captain (to Lindbergh tower)	One eighty-two's cleared to land.
09:01:11	First officer	Are we clear of that Cessna?
09:01:13	Flight engineer	Supposed to be
09:01:14	Captain	I guess
09:01:15	First officer	(Fifteen)
Between 09:01:15 and 20	Unknown	((Sound of laughter))
09:01:20	Off-duty captain	I hope
09:01:21	Captain	Oh yeah, before we turned downwind, I saw him at about one o'clock, probably behind us now

Despite the captain's comment that the Cessna was "probably behind us now," it was actually directly in front of and below the Boeing. The PSA plane was descending and rapidly closing in on the small plane, which had taken a right turn to the east, deviating from the assigned course. According to the report issued by the National Transportation Safety Board (NTSB), the Cessna may have been a difficult visual target for the jet's pilots, as it was below them and was difficult to perceive against the multicolored houses of the residential area beneath. The Cessna's fuselage was yellow, and most of the houses were a yellowish color. Also, the apparent motion of the Cessna as viewed from the Boeing was minimized, as the planes were on approximately the same course. The report said that another possible reason that the PSA aircrew had difficulty observing the Cessna was that its fuselage appeared smaller because of foreshortening. However, the same report in another section also stated, "the white surface of the Cessna's wing could have presented a relatively bright target in the morning sunlight."

A visibility study cited in the NTSB report concluded that the Cessna should have been almost centered in the windshield of the Boeing from 170 to 90 seconds before the collision, and thereafter it was probably positioned on the lower portion of the windshield just above the windshield wipers. The study also said that the Cessna pilot would have had about a 10-second view of the Boeing from the left-door window about 90 seconds before the collision, but visibility of the overtaking jet was blocked by the Cessna's ceiling structure for the remainder of the time.

Flight 182's crew never explicitly alerted the tower that they had lost sight of the Cessna. If they had made this clear to controllers, the crash might not have happened. Also, if the Cessna had maintained the heading of 70° assigned by ATC instead of turning to 90°, the NTSB estimates that the planes would have missed each other by about 1,000 ft (300 m). Ultimately, the NTSB maintained that, regardless of that change in course, it was the responsibility of the crew in the overtaking jet to comply with the regulatory requirement to pass clear of the Cessna.

Approach control received an automated conflict alert 19 seconds before the collision but did not relay this information to the aircraft because, according to the approach coordinator, such alerts were commonplace even when no actual conflict existed. The NTSB stated: "Based on all information available to him, he decided that the crew of Flight 182 were complying with their visual separation clearance; that they were accomplishing an overtake maneuver within the separation parameters of the conflict alert computer; and that, therefore, no conflict existed."

This was the conversation in the PSA cockpit starting 16 seconds before collision with the Cessna:

# = Nonpertinent word * = Unintelligible word () = Questionable text (()) = Commentary
Time	Source	Content
09:01:31	First officer	Gear down
09:01:34	((Clicks and sound similar to gear extension))	
09:01:38	First officer	There's one underneath
09:01:39	Unknown	*
09:01:39	First officer	I was looking at that inbound there
09:01:42	((Sound of thump similar to nose gear door closing))	
09:01:45	Captain	Whoop!
09:01:46	First officer	Aaargh!
09:01:47	((Sound of impact))	
09:01:47	Off-duty captain	Oh # #

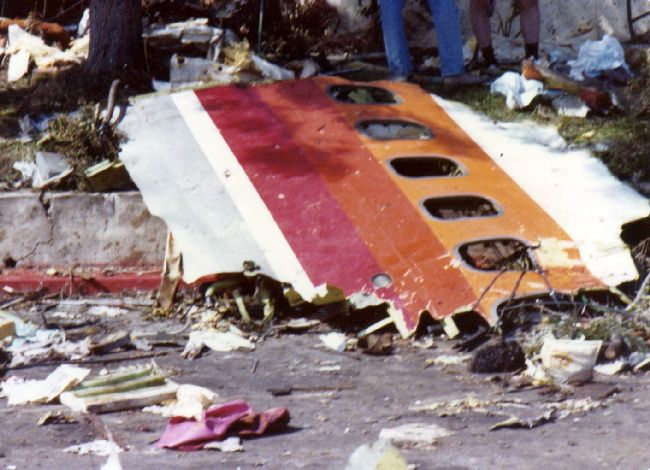
Wreckage of PSA 182 after the crash

PSA Flight 182 overtook the Cessna, which was directly below it, both roughly on a 090 (due east) heading. The collision occurred at about 2,600 feet (790 m). According to several witnesses on the ground, they first heard a loud metallic crunching sound, then an explosion, and a fire drew them to look skyward.

Staff photographer Hans Wendt of the San Diego County Public Relations Office was attending an outdoor press event with a still camera and took two post-collision photographs of the falling 727, its right wing burning. Cameraman Steve Howell from local TV channel 39 was attending the same event and captured the Cessna on film as it fell toward the ground, the sound of the impacting 727 and the mushroom cloud from the resulting crash. For its coverage of the disaster, The San Diego Evening Tribune, a predecessor to The San Diego Union-Tribune, was awarded a Pulitzer Prize in 1979 for its reporting.

The wreckage of the Cessna plummeted to the ground, its vertical stabilizer torn from its fuselage and bent leftward, its debris hitting around 3,500 feet (1,100 m) northwest of where the 727 crashed. PSA 182's right wing was heavily damaged, rendering the plane uncontrollable and sending it careening into a sharp right bank (seen in the Wendt photos), and its fuel tank ruptured and started a fire. The final conversation took place inside the cockpit:

# = Nonpertinent word * = Unintelligible word () = Questionable text (()) = Commentary
Time	Source	Content
09:01:48	Unknown	#
09:01:49	Captain	Easy baby, easy baby
09:01:50	Unknown	Yeah
09:01:51	((Sound of electrical system reactivation tone on voice recorder, system off less than one second))	
09:01:51	Captain	What have we got here?
09:01:52	First officer	It's bad
09:01:52	Captain	Huh?
09:01:53	First officer	We're hit man, we are hit
09:01:55	Captain (to Lindbergh tower)	Tower, we're going down, this is PSA
09:01:57	Lindbergh tower	OK, we'll call the equipment for you
09:01:58	Unknown	Whoo!
09:01:58	((Sound of stall warning))	
09:01:59	Unknown	Bob!
09:01:59	Captain (to Lindbergh tower)	Oh, this is it, baby!
09:02:00	First officer	# # #
09:02:01	Unknown	# #
09:02:03	Captain (on intercom, to passengers)	Brace yourself
09:02:04	Unknown	Hey, baby *
09:02:04	Unknown	Ma, I love ya
09:02:04.5	((Electrical power to recorder stops))	

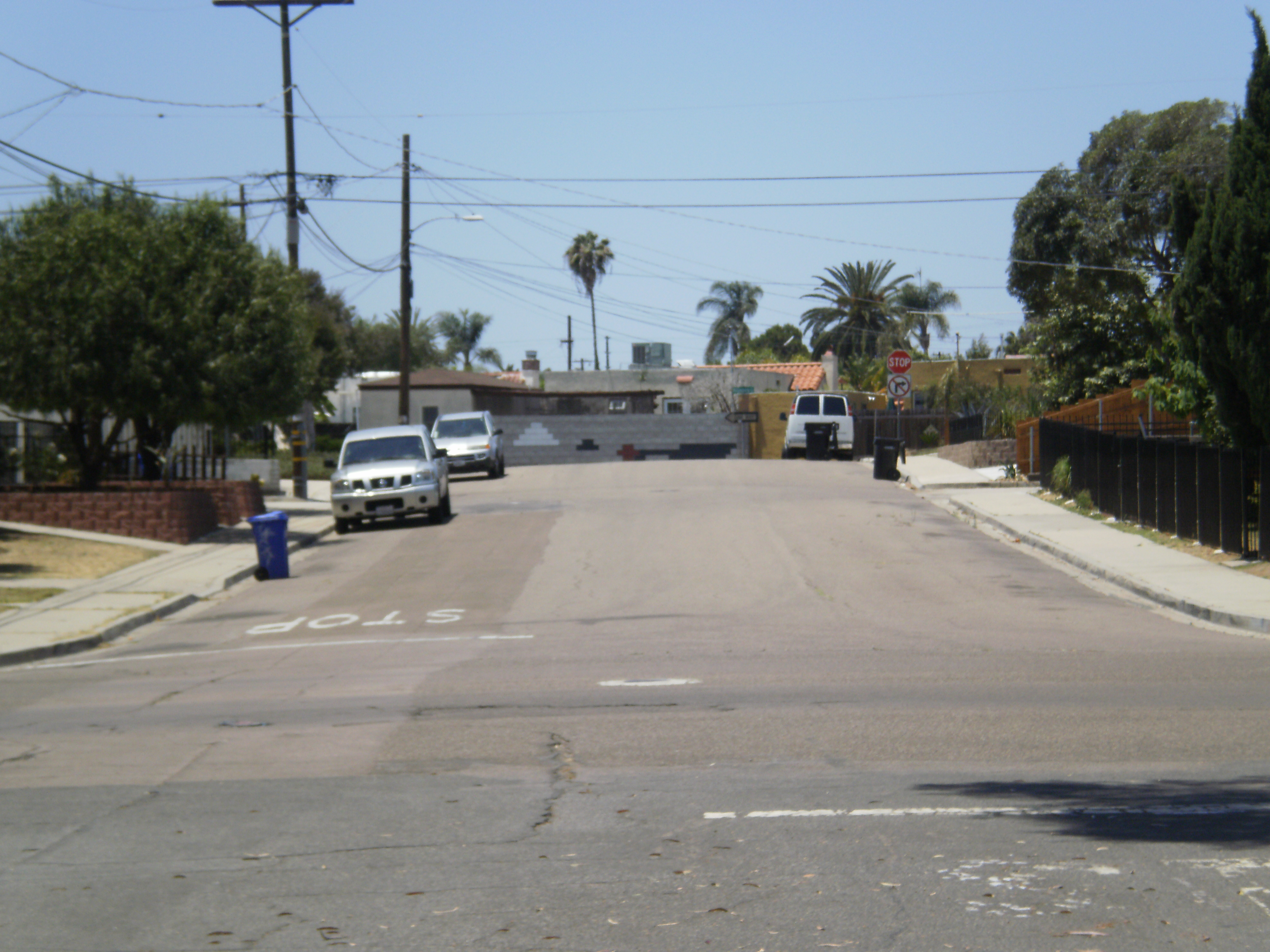
PSA 182 crash site as it appeared in 2010: Looking west down Dwight St., Nile Street intersection is in foreground; Boundary St. intersection in background. The initial impact was about 30 ft (9.1 m) to the right of the photographer, on Nile St.

Flight 182 struck a house at 3611 Nile Street, 3 miles (5 km) northeast of Lindbergh Field, in the North Park neighborhood of San Diego. It then impacted the driveway of the house at 260 knots (300 mph; 480 km/h), in a nose-down attitude while banked 50° to the right. Seismographic readings indicated that the impact occurred at 09:02:07, about 2.5 seconds after the cockpit voice recorder lost power. The plane crashed just west of the I-805 freeway, around 30 feet (9.1 m) north of the intersection of Dwight and Nile Streets, with the bulk of the debris field spreading in a northeast to southwesterly direction toward Boundary Street. One of the plane's wings lodged in a house. The largest piece of the Cessna impacted about six blocks away near 32nd Street and Polk Avenue. Cheryl "Sherry" Walker, a resident in the North Park neighborhood, was taking her 3-year old son Derek to her friend, Nancy Stout's, daycare center just as the plane crashed into the intersection. The impact propelled shrapnel into the center, destroying part of the roof. Walker and Derek were killed, as were Nancy Stout and her 4-year old son Robert in the daycare center. 3 residents living in adjacent homes were also killed (Amy Bolick, Lela Todd, and Darlene Watkins). The explosion and fire created a mushroom cloud that could be seen for miles. About 60% of the San Diego Fire Department was ultimately dispatched to the scene. The severity of the crash resulted in the engines, tail section and landing gear being the only recognizable parts from the aircraft. One of the policemen who arrived on the scene, officer P. L. Thornton, came across a car onto which a body from the aircraft had landed due to the force of the impact. Inside were 2 occupants: Mary Fuller of Lakeside, California and her infant son, who were driving down Boundary Street and had been hit by glass catapulted by the impact. Both were severely injured but alive (the Season 11 episode of Air Crash Investigation titled "Blind Spot" dramatizing the accident features a news report of the crash where a witness stated that both were killed, but this is false).

In total, 144 people died in the crash, including Flight 182's seven crew members, 30 additional PSA employees deadheading to PSA's San Diego base, the two Cessna occupants and seven residents (five women, two boys) on the ground. Among the victims was the son of Oscar-winning actress Claire Trevor as well as a passenger who was pregnant with her sixth child.

== Investigation ==
At the nearby St. Augustine High School, a triage and command and control center was established, with its gymnasium used as a makeshift morgue and for forensic investigation. Freezer units were used to preserve the biological remains, as San Diego was in the middle of a severe heat wave, with temperatures exceeding 100 °F (38 °C).

National Transportation Safety Board report number NTSB/AAR-79-05, released April 19, 1979, determined that the probable cause of the accident was the failure of the PSA flight crew to follow proper air traffic control (ATC) procedures. Flight 182's crew lost sight of the Cessna in contravention of ATC instructions to "keep visual separation from that traffic" and did not alert ATC that they had lost sight of it. Errors on the part of ATC were also named as contributing factors, including the use of visual separation procedures when radar clearances were available. Additionally, the Cessna pilots, for unknown reasons, did not maintain their assigned east-northeasterly heading of 070° after completing a practice instrument approach, nor did they notify ATC of their course change. The NTSB report states, "According to the testimony of the controllers and the assistant chief flight instructor of the Gibbs Flite Center (owner of the Cessna), the 08:59:56 transmission from approach control to the Cessna only imposed an altitude limitation on the pilot, he was not required to maintain the 070° heading. However, the assistant chief flight instructor (also) testified that he would expect the [Cessna] pilot to fly the assigned heading or inform the controller that he was not able to do so."

A dissenting opinion in the original NTSB crash report by member Francis H. McAdams strongly questioned why the unauthorized change in course by the Cessna was not specifically cited as a "contributing factor" in the final report; instead, it was listed as simply a "finding", which carries less weight. McAdams also sharply disagreed with the majority of the panel on other issues, giving more weight to inadequate ATC procedures as another probable cause of the accident, rather than merely treating them as a contributing factor. McAdams also added the "possible misidentification of the Cessna by the PSA aircrew due to the presence of a third unknown aircraft in the area" as a contributing factor. The majority panel members did not cite this as a credible possibility. In an August 1982 amendment to the probable-cause finding, the NTSB adopted McAdams' viewpoints regarding both ATC and pilot failings.

The report states that in the PSA cockpit, some conversation was not relevant to the flight during its critical phases. The report states that the conversation was not a causal factor in the accident, but that "it does point out the dangers inherent in this type of cockpit environment during descent and approach to landing."

The two photographs of Flight 182 taken by Hans Wendt revealed that the left-wing flaps were extended as the crew tried to steer the crippled aircraft and that the right wing had a large piece missing where the Cessna had struck. Although it was obvious that the flaps were damaged or destroyed by the collision, NTSB investigators could not determine the condition of the hydraulic system in the wing and whether the plumbing inside it had been ruptured or merely flattened. As the right wing was extremely fragmented, examination of debris provided no useful information. The crew may have tried to guide the 727 away from impacting a residential area and onto Route 805 where damage would be lessened, but could not do so. The final conclusion of the NTSB was that even if the hydraulic lines in the right wing were undamaged, the missing flaps and spreading fire would have adversely affected the plane's aerodynamic profile, and in all likelihood Flight 182 was completely uncontrollable after the collision.

== Aftermath ==
In the aftermath of the devastation on the ground, a controversy was renewed in San Diego over the placement of such a busy airport in a heavily populated area. Despite proposals to relocate it, San Diego International Airport, the busiest single-runway commercial airport in the U.S., remains in use at the same site. The crash site was cordoned by police and remained so for an entire year.

At the time, PSA Flight 182 was the U.S.'s deadliest commercial air disaster, surpassed eight months later on May 25, 1979, when American Airlines Flight 191 (a McDonnell Douglas DC-10) crashed in Chicago.

As a result of the crash, the NTSB recommended the immediate implementation of a terminal radar service area around Lindbergh Field to provide for the separation of aircraft, as well as an immediate review of control procedures for all busy terminal areas. This initial rule did not include small, general-aviation aircraft. Therefore, on May 15, 1980, the Federal Aviation Administration implemented Class B airspace to provide for the separation of all aircraft operating in the area. Additionally, all aircraft, regardless of size, are required to operate under positive radar control, a rule that allows only radar control from the ground for all aircraft operating in the airport's airspace.

At the time of the crash, Lindbergh Field was the only airport in San Diego County with an instrument landing system. As the Cessna pilot was practicing instrument landings, the FAA quickly installed the system at Montgomery Field and McClellan-Palomar Airport, as well as a localizer approach to Gillespie Field, to allow pilots to practice at smaller airports.

As a result of this and other midair collisions (including a similar one in 1986) a traffic collision alert and avoidance system (TCAS) is now installed in all commercial passenger aircraft and in most commercial cargo airplanes. TCAS issues visual and audible warnings in the cockpit when two aircraft are approaching each other, and directs pilots to either climb or descend to avoid the other aircraft. However, the system works only if at least one aircraft is equipped with TCAS and the other with a transponder. After the 1986 midair collision, all flights in Class B were required to carry a Mode C transponder. The International Civil Aviation Organization does not require TCAS on the type of small, single-engine planes that were involved in the PSA disaster or the 1986 crash. Only aircraft certified to carry 19 or more passengers or with a maximum takeoff weight of more than 12,600 lb (5,700 kg) are affected by the TCAS rule.

Because the PSA 182/Cessna collision was the result of pilot error, it is used as a teaching aid in modern flight training. Embry-Riddle Aeronautical University uses the crash in human-factors classes, while others reference it when teaching airspace or visual separation rules.

Don St. Germain, who was an employee with PSA, was working aboard the flight when he died with the other 134 passengers and crew. Nine years later, his brother-in-law Douglas Arthur, who was a PSA pilot, was killed aboard PSA Flight 1771 near Cayucos, California, along with 42 other passengers and crew, by recently fired employee David Augustus Burke. Burke shot his former boss, a flight attendant, the two pilots and Arthur before he sent the plane into a nosedive, causing the aircraft to crash at the speed of sound. As such, Nikki St. Germain lost her brother in the first deadly crash of a PSA flight and her husband in the second. Those were the only two deadly crashes in the 40-year history of the airline.

== Memorials ==
A memorial plaque honoring those who died on both planes and on the ground is located in the San Diego Air & Space Museum in Balboa Park. On the 20th anniversary of the crash, a memorial tree and plaque were dedicated next to the North Park branch library.

Two permanent public memorials were dedicated in North Park on the 46th anniversary of the disaster in September 2024. The City of San Diego installed a permanent bronze memorial plaque at the intersection of Dwight and Nile Streets—the exact site where the commercial aircraft struck the ground—which officially lists the names of all 144 victims.

Concurrently, a permanent memorial prayer garden was dedicated at St. Augustine High School, initiated by a gift from the Class of 1980 in gratitude to the Augustinian Friars. The school campus served as an immediate triage center and its Dougherty Gymnasium was utilized as a makeshift morgue during recovery efforts. Driven forward by the PSA Flight 182 Historical Memorial Committee, the site features a granite wall inscribed with a dedication honoring first responders, along with a mosaic background composed of 144 hand-painted symbolic tiles in PSA's historic red and orange corporate colors to represent each individual life lost.

The permanent bronze memorial plaque at Dwight and Nile Streets, photographed two years after its 2024 installation.

A custom photo collage documenting the neighborhood site preparation and the physical installation of the permanent plaque.

The permanent memorial prayer garden at St. Augustine High School illuminated at dusk.

Close-up view of the St. Augustine memorial wall text and 144 symbolic mosaic tiles.

The engraved step dedication stone inspired by the Class of 1980.

== Depictions in media ==
The ATC recording of the accident, as well as graphic footage of the aftermath, was included in the mondo film Faces of Death, released two months after the crash.

The accident was covered in Season 11 of the documentary TV series Mayday in an episode titled "Blind Spot". The episode features interviews with witnesses and accident investigators as well as recreations of the crash.

The accident was covered in MSNBC's Why Planes Crash in the episode "Collision Course", which first aired on April 27, 2013.

Years later, Whoopi Goldberg, who had witnessed the collision, cited the crash as the reason why she had stopped traveling by air.

== See also ==
- Aeroméxico Flight 498, a similar 1986 midair collision between an airliner and a light aircraft over southern California
- American Airlines Flight 5342, a 2025 midair collision involving an airliner operated by a different "PSA" under the American Eagle brand
- List of notable midair collisions
