= American Airlines Flight 723 =

1953 aviation accident

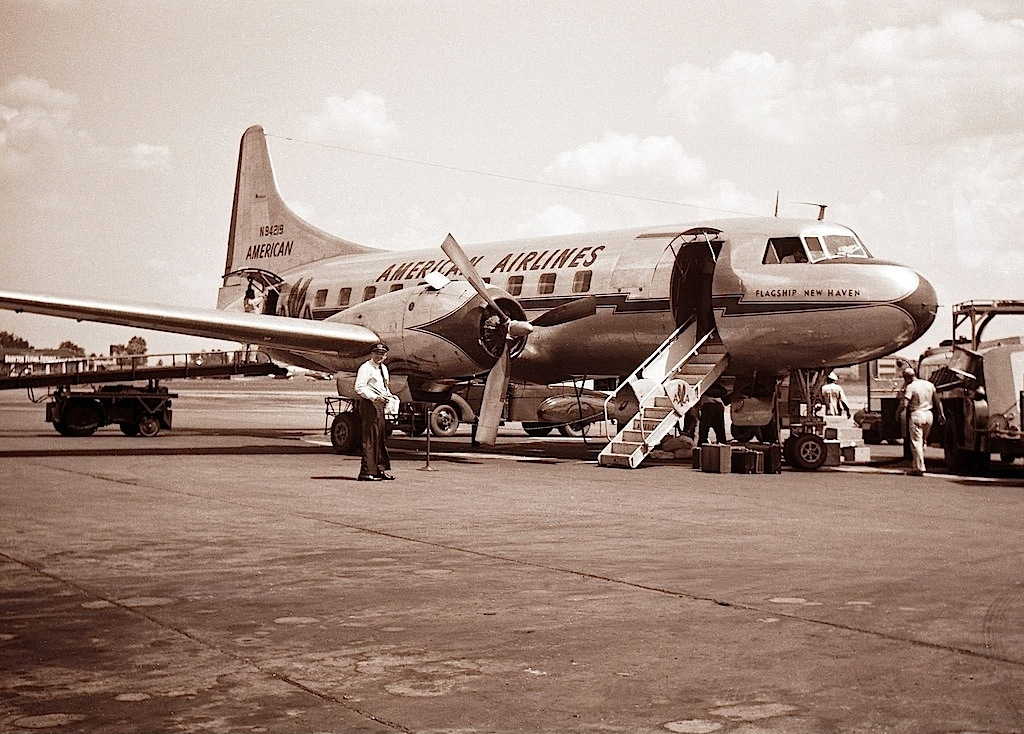
- An American Airlines Convair 240 similar to the accident aircraft

Accident
- Date: September 16, 1953
- Summary: Controlled flight into terrain, pilot error
- Site: Colonie, New York, on approach to Albany Airport; 42.7341°N 73.8616°W

Aircraft
- Aircraft type: Convair CV-240-0
- Aircraft name: Flagship Bristol
- Operator: American Airlines
- Registration: N94255
- Flight origin: Boston Airport
- 1st stopover: Bradley International Airport, Hartford, Connecticut
- 2nd stopover: Albany Airport, New York
- 3rd stopover: Syracuse Hancock Airport, New York
- 4th stopover: Rochester Monroe County Airport, New York
- 5th stopover: Buffalo Municipal Airport, New York
- Last stopover: Willow Run Airport, Detroit, Michigan
- Destination: Chicago Midway Airport, Illinois
- Occupants: 28
- Passengers: 25
- Crew: 3
- Fatalities: 28
- Survivors: 0

American Airlines Flight 723 was a scheduled American Airlines flight from Boston Airport in Massachusetts, to Chicago Midway Airport in Illinois. On September 16, 1953, a Convair 240 propliner flying this route crashed while attempting to land at Albany Airport in upstate New York, killing all 28 people on board.

== Accident ==
The Convair had arrived at Bradley Field from Boston Airport at 6:57 am for a scheduled stopover. At that time, weather at Albany was below airline landing minima, but was forecast to improve within limits by the flight's scheduled arrival time. The flight left Bradley at 7:14, and once in the Albany terminal area, found poor visibility preventing landings, with several aircraft ahead of it in a holding pattern. The flight joined the holding pattern, circling while awaiting weather conditions legal for landing.

At 7:50, a special weather observation reported thin obscurement, with an overcast cloud ceiling estimated at 4,000 feet (1,200 m) above the airport. Horizontal visibility was 3/4 mile (1.2 km), obscured by fog. Two aircraft left the holding pattern, making attempts to land, but both made missed approaches. A third landed at 8:16 following an instrument approach to runway 19. After the latest airplane's successful landing, Flight 723 was cleared to execute the same instrument approach to runway 19. At 8:19, the flight advised the tower that because the aircraft's flaps could not be lowered, they would be abandoning their approach and returning to the holding pattern.

At 8:30, the Albany control tower reported: "All aircraft holding Albany. It now appears to be pretty good for a contact approach from the west. It looks much better than to the north," the north being the direction from which approaches to runway 19 had been attempted.

Flight 723 was cleared for a contact approach to runway 10. On final approach, while still miles west of the airport, the Convair descended too low, and at an altitude of 308 feet (94 m), struck a set of three 365-foot (111 m)-tall radio masts arrayed east to west. The right wing struck the center tower of the three, then the left wing struck the east tower. Seven feet of the outer panel of the right wing including the right aileron and control mechanism from the center hinge outboard together with 15 feet of the left outer wing panel and aileron separated from the aircraft.

Ground impact occurred 1,590 feet (480 m) beyond the east tower. At this point, the aircraft had rolled to a partially inverted attitude. The nose and left wing struck the ground first. The rest of the airplane fell to earth in short order and caught fire. The aircraft narrowly missed hitting a trailer park on Albany-Schenectady Road. All 28 occupants on board (25 passengers, two pilots, and a flight attendant) were killed.

At the time of the accident, a special weather observation reported thin scattered clouds at 500 feet, with a ceiling of broken clouds estimated at 4500 feet. The visibility had improved to 1 1/2 miles (2.4 km) in fog.

== Investigation ==
The Civil Aeronautics Board investigated the accident and issued a report wherein they identified the probable cause of the accident: "During the execution of a contact approach, and while maneuvering for alignment with the runway to be used, descent was made to an altitude below obstructions partially obscured by fog in a local area of restricted visibility."

Samuel Bloom of Troy, NY had a reservation to be aboard this flight; however, he missed his originating flight from Albany to Boston on September 15 because of heavy traffic on the way to the airport and opted to drive to Boston instead. The heavy traffic ultimately saved his life. This same man missed a ferry during WW2 and was forced to fly. The ferry sank.
