= Disruptive solutions process =

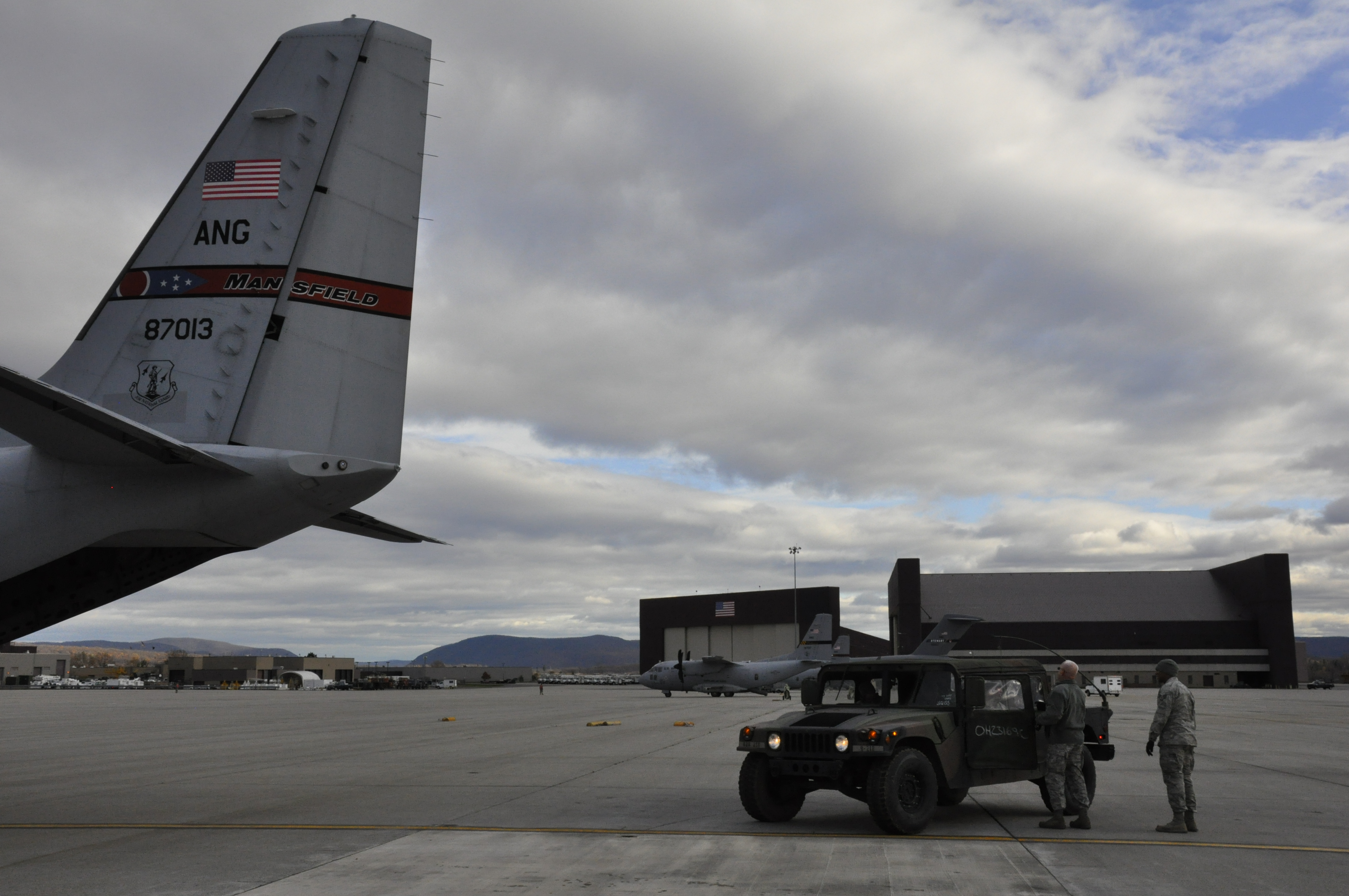
The Air National Guard is the primary user of DSP.

The disruptive solutions process (DSP) is a decision-making process used by the United States Air Force and Air National Guard. It was created in 2005 by fighter pilot and Air Force/Air National Guard Colonel Edward Vaughan and is iterative, low-cost, and first-to-market in nature. It is primarily used to prevent mishaps during the combat operations process.

== Overview ==
The typical defense industry bureaucratic approach to problem-solving involves long lead times and relative inflexibility. Long development cycles and lead times results in solutions that are no longer relevant.

Recent attempts to resolve inefficiencies include overwhelming the problem with funding, resources, and manpower—for example, major weapon systems development, such as a new fighter jet or IT system. Conversely, when resources are constrained, bureaucratic staff adopt continuous process improvement, similar to kaizen, total quality management, and Lean Six Sigma. This perpetuates low-value programs that should be eliminated, rather than "improved".

Because most preventable safety mishaps are caused by human factors, safety should apply a disruptive, iterative approach that may not be appropriate in hardware-focused programs, such as aircraft production.

To address the cultural issues associated with mishap prevention in a large bureaucracy, the Air National Guard safety directorate used Boyd's Observe, Orient, Decide, Act Loop to assess the effectiveness of the process. This was the origin of DSP.

DSP is persistent and adaptive:

Persistence is about refusing to give up even in the face of adversity. Adaptation is about shortening the time to success through ingenuity and flexibility. "Adaptive persistence" entails alternating between anticipation, changing course, and sticking with it, deftly navigating that paradox with aplomb.

== Basic process ==
DSP is a six-step process that focuses on projecting future market needs by looking at front-line problem solving activity and scaling those solutions up. Although the full algorithm has not been publicly published as of January 2024, the following process has been made public:

1. POLL FIELD—IDEA MINING: Use network of professionals at the field unit level to identify best practice mishap prevention, education, mishap investigation, procurement, and other tools.

2. CONSOLIDATE / RACK AND STACK: Sort list of ideas into groups based on resource requirements, proven record, technology leveraging, mission accomplishment, and identified needs. Rank order all projects based on overall value to the force using DSP assessment algorithm.

3. ELIMINATE BAD FITS: Scrub the list for those items requiring major hardware, Air Force Major Command level funding, or other special, difficult to acquire funding or processes. Also remove from consideration solutions that duplicate or compete directly with future programmed or existing military programs unless the cost savings is significant, as well as those programs that are not scalable in scope.

4. SELECT AND DEM/VAL: Consider resource requirements and rapidly source field unit funding or headquarters seed monies in the sub-$50K range to perform a limited demonstration and validation (DEM/VAL) of concept. Use rapid contracting mechanisms through government contracting office, primarily employing SBA set-asides, blanket purchase agreements, or previously procured assets that may be re-roled into current use.

5. ITERATE FOR RESULTS: Establish definition of success that are measurable and reportable. Then, demonstrate measurable results within six months. Meanwhile, seek further external and scalable funding from sources such as DARPA, Defense Safety Oversight Council (DSOC), other services, other government agencies, etc.

6. LEAD AND MARKET: Communicate and advocate the proposed solution and ask for support from relevant stakeholders, including experts who helped develop the solution. Determine project leaders with adequate skills and duties to lead the project.

This is a form of the more well known OODA loop. Step 1 is Observe, steps 2 and 3 are Orient, steps 4 and 5 are Decide, and step 6 is Act.

== History ==
The disruptive solutions process was first used in 2004, when a joint team led by Vaughan created Project Black Mountain. The project evolved from a combined requirement to share real-time tactical data among ground and air forces, as well as avoid mid-air collisions within the area of responsibility. The term 'disruptive' was borrowed from the marketing term "disruptive technologies".

More recently, DSP has been used in the Air National Guard and the United States Air Force to field mishap prevention programs:

- See and Avoid: a web-based civilian-military midair collision avoidance program created by Vaughan and led by the Air National Guard Safety directorate from 2005 to 2009.
- WingmanDay.org: provides tools for commanders, leaders, and care practitioners. In 2011, the program was relaunched as Wingman Day. The Air Force Safety Center took the RealBase Toolkit concept and developed one-stop-shopping online tool kits hosted on the secure Air Force Portal.
- FlyAwake: a web-based fatigue risk management tool which returns quantitative fatigue analysis for a given flight schedule.
- Wingman Project: a suicide intervention initiative that shows family and friends of distressed Airmen how to intervene to save a life, providing training in 54 U.S. states and territories.
- dBird bird mortality model: tracks and predicts movements of pathogen-infected bird flocks using bird-aircraft-strike-hazard resources.
- Low Altitude Deconfliction Program: an online scheduling function with the Federal Aviation Administration's MADE program to avoid collisions for military aircraft operating in low-altitude environments.
- Ready 54: an online joint resiliency outreach and education tool with associated mobile apps.

On September 25, 2009, Dr. John Ohab of the American Forces Press Service interviewed Vaughan about DSP.

== See also ==
- OODA Loop
- Problem solving
- Systempunkt
- Maintenance resource management
- Mid-air collision
- Intrapreneurship
