= Visual approach =

Aircraft landing procedure under clear weather conditions

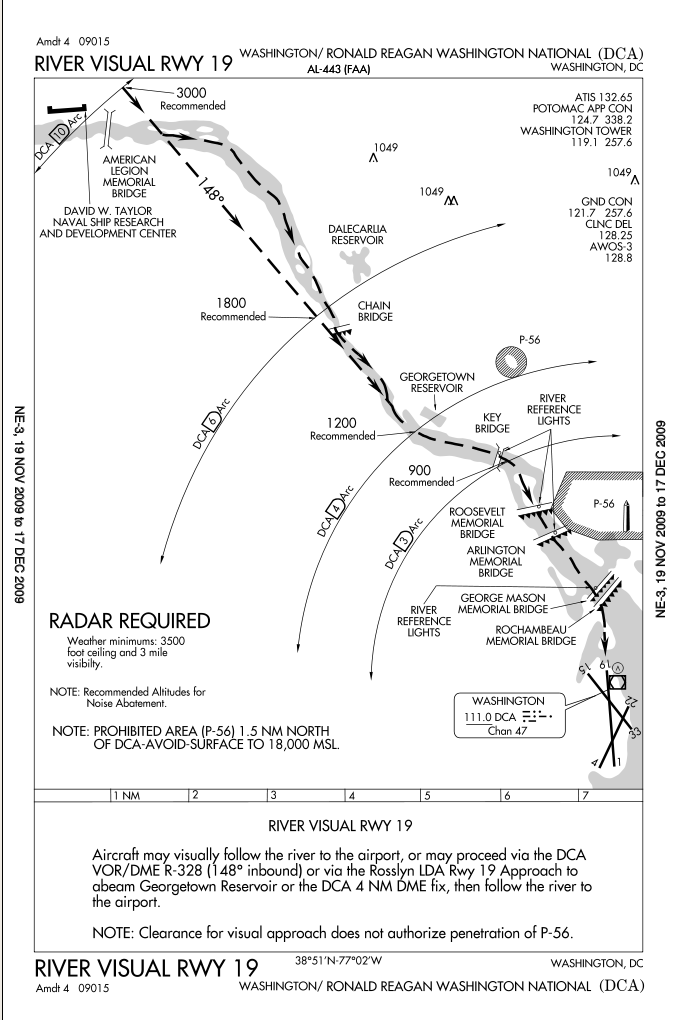
Approach plate for the river visual 19 into Ronald Reagan Washington National Airport. Pilots fly above the Potomac River until over the Rochambeau Memorial Bridge at which time they line up for their final approach.

In aviation, a visual approach is an approach to a runway at an airport conducted under instrument flight rules (IFR) but where the pilot proceeds by visual reference and clear of clouds to the airport. The pilot must at all times have either the airport or the preceding aircraft in sight. This approach must be authorized and under the control of the appropriate air traffic control (ATC) facility. The International Civil Aviation Organization (ICAO) definition adds that the visual approach can commence when "either part or all of an instrument approach is not completed", varying only slightly from the Federal Aviation Administration regulation and is essentially identical.

== Purpose ==
The visual approach allows a pilot to fly to the runway without having to perform an instrument approach. This can greatly reduce pilot and controller workload, and expedite traffic by shortening flight paths to the airport. Taking a shorter route to the airport in lieu of flying a complicated instrument approach procedure (IAP) can increase pilot safety, as the critical tasks of approach and landing occur when pilots are most fatigued. Controllers also benefit from visual approaches, for whom a visual approach is an essential tool in the effort to maximize traffic flow (especially at busy airports). Visual approaches dramatically reduce controller workload—ATC's IFR separation requirements may be reduced, under specific rules and circumstances, which relieves controllers of the burden.

Visual approaches can also result in additional risks such as the misidentification of the landing runway, which resulted in an Atlas Air Boeing 747 LCF landing at the small Colonel James Jabara Airport rather than McConnell Air Force Base where it intended to land. Other similar incidents have occurred. Particularly in congested airspace, visual approaches can increase pilot workload due to the high situational awareness required. This is because when a pilot accepts a visual approach, the pilot accepts responsibility for establishing a safe landing interval behind the preceding aircraft, as well as wake-turbulence avoidance and to remain clear of clouds.

According to ICAO Doc. 4444, (def., 6.5.3 + 6.5.4.3 + 8.9.5) an approach by an IFR flight when either part or all of an instrument approach procedure is not completed and the approach is executed in visual reference to terrain. The pilot shall maintain visual reference to terrain and the reported ceiling shall be at or above the approved initial approach level. Metrological conditions is such that a visual approach and landing can be completed. For radar vectors, a clearance for visual approach shall only be issued if the pilot has reported the aerodrome or preceding aircraft in sight, at the time where vectors would normally cease. Part-NCO.OP page 27: A visual approach is not permitted when runway visual range (RVR) is less than 800 metres.

== See also ==
- Contact approach
- Instrument approach
- Night VFR (NVFR)
- Special visual flight rules (SVFR)
- Visual flight rules § Controlled visual flight rules (CVFR)
