= Flight rules =

Flight rules are regulations and procedures adopted for flying aircraft in various conditions. Flight rule regimes include:

- Instrument flight rules, regulations and procedures for flying aircraft by referring only to the aircraft instrument panel for navigation
- Night visual flight rules or night rating, the rules under which flight primarily by visual reference is done at night
- Special visual flight rules, a set of aviation regulations under which a pilot may operate an aircraft
- Visual flight rules, a set of regulations which allow a pilot to operate an aircraft in weather conditions generally clear enough to allow the pilot to see where the aircraft is going

== See also ==
- Instrument meteorological conditions, weather conditions that normally require pilots to fly under instrument flight rules
- Visual meteorological conditions, weather conditions that normally require pilots to fly under visual flight rules
