= Safarilink Aviation Flight 053 =

2024 mid-air collision over Kenya

Accident
- Date: 5 March 2024
- Summary: Mid-air collision, under investigation
- Site: over Nairobi National Park, Nairobi, Kenya; 1°20′32″S 36°50′01″E
- Total fatalities: 2
- Total survivors: 44

First aircraft
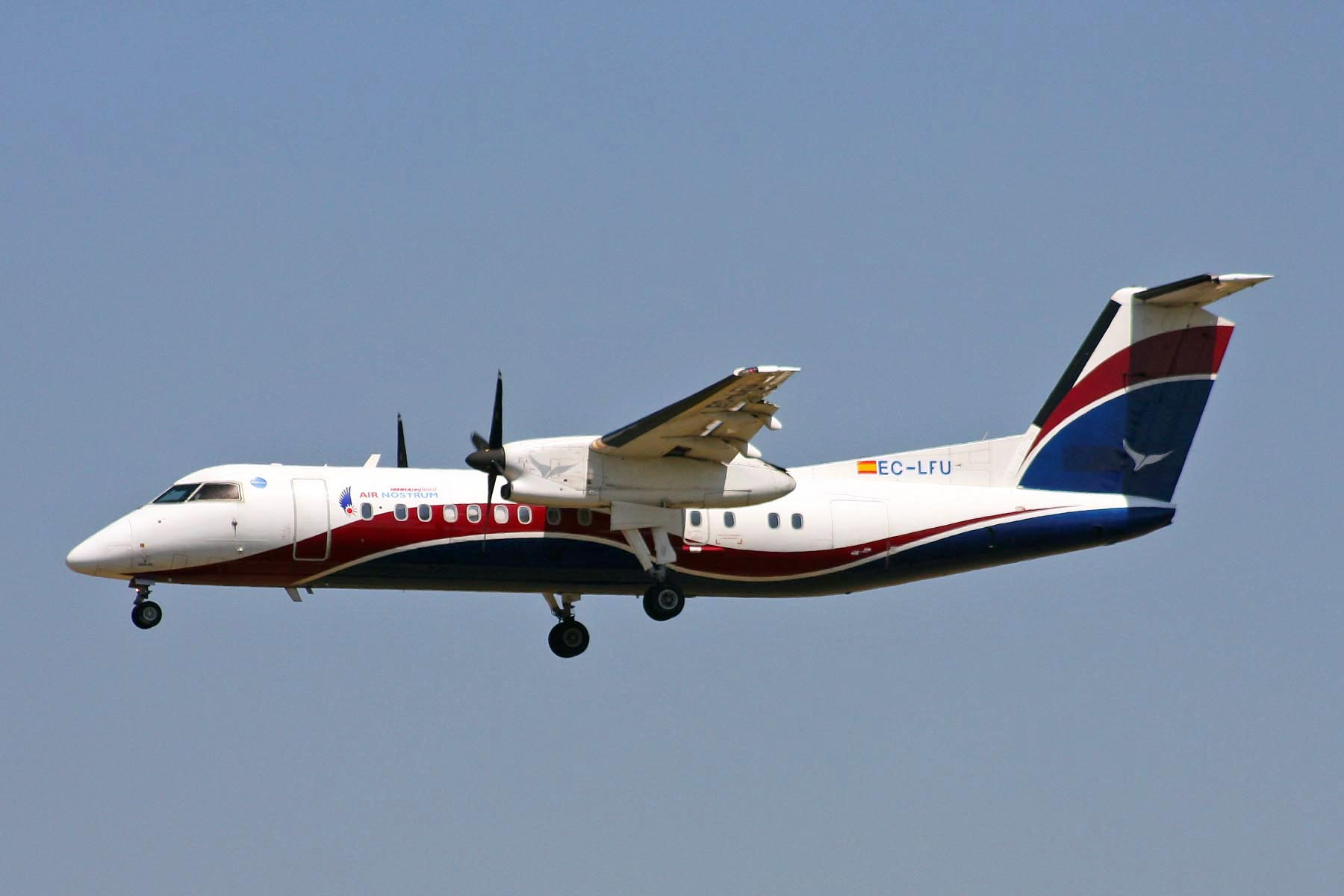
- The aircraft involved in the accident pictured with Air Nostrum in 2012
- Type: De Havilland Canada DHC-8-315
- Operator: Safarilink Aviation
- IATA flight No.: F2053
- ICAO flight No.: XLK053
- Call sign: SAFARILINK 053
- Registration: 5Y-SLK
- Flight origin: Wilson Airport, Nairobi, Kenya
- Destination: Ukunda Airport, Diani, Kenya
- Occupants: 44
- Passengers: 39
- Crew: 5
- Fatalities: 0
- Survivors: 44

Second aircraft
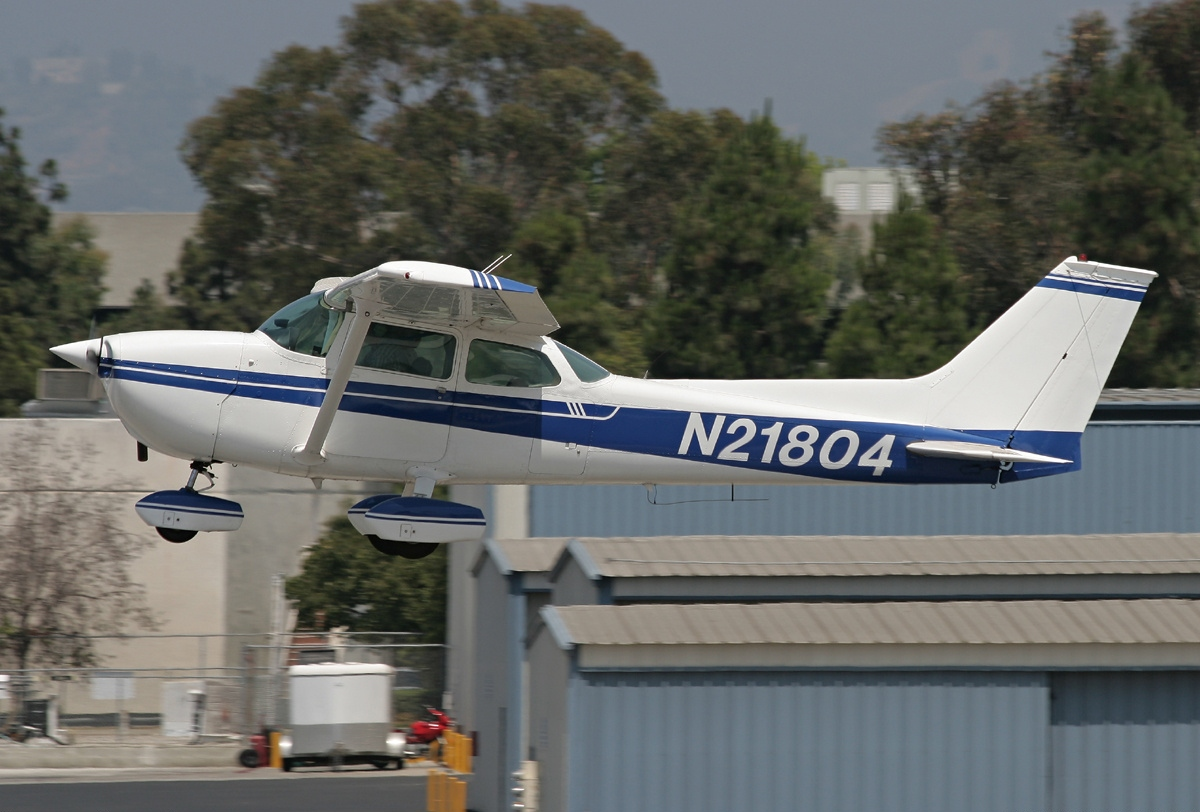
- A Cessna 172M, similar to the accident aircraft
- Type: Cessna 172M
- Operator: 99 Flying School
- Registration: 5Y-NNJ
- Flight origin: Wilson Airport, Nairobi, Kenya
- Destination: Wilson Airport, Nairobi, Kenya
- Occupants: 2
- Crew: 2
- Fatalities: 2
- Survivors: 0

On 5 March 2024, Safarilink Aviation Flight 053, a De Havilland Canada Dash 8, en route from Wilson Airport in Nairobi, Kenya, to Ukunda Airport, Kenya, collided soon after takeoff with a Cessna 172 training flight operated by 99 Flying School over Nairobi National Park. The Dash 8 returned to Wilson Airport and landed safely with part of the deicing boot missing, and with all 44 aboard unharmed, but the Cessna spun out of control and crashed in the national park, killing both occupants.

== Background ==
=== Flight 053 ===
==== Aircraft ====
The first aircraft involved in the collision was a De Havilland Canada Dash 8-315, manufacturer serial number 574, and registered as 5Y-SLK. The aircraft was manufactured by Bombardier Aviation on 28 September 2001 and in its 22 years of service, it had accumulated around 32,000 flight hours in around 35,000 cycles, (Note: In an aircraft with cabin pressurisation, each time the cabin is pressurised is counted as a cycle; this number is typically slightly less than the number of flights.) and was equipped with two Pratt & Whitney Canada PW123E engines.

==== Crew ====
The flight consisted of 39 passengers and 5 crew members: 2 pilots, 2 flight attendants, and an engineer. The captain had logged around 7,500 flight hours, with 1,600 hours in the Dash 8 and the first officer had logged 3,200 flight hours, with 110 hours on the type.

=== 5Y-NNJ ===
==== Aircraft ====
The second aircraft involved was a Cessna 172M, registered 5Y-NNJ with serial number 172-65726. The aircraft was built by the Cessna Aircraft Company in 1976 and in its 48 years of service before the accident, it logged around 12,300 flight hours, and it was equipped with a Lycoming O-320-E2D engine.

==== Crew ====
The flight crew consisted of an instructor pilot and a student pilot. The instructor had logged around 670 flight hours, while the student pilot had accumulated around 49 flight hours.

== Accident ==
The collision occurred at around 09:34 EAT (6:34 UTC) in visual meteorological conditions.

Safarilink Aviation Flight 053 was operating from Wilson Airport en route to Ukunda Airport in the coastal resort town of Diani Beach. The captain was the pilot flying and the first officer (FO) was the pilot monitoring. At 9:29 GMT, Flight 053 was cleared to taxi to runway 14 via taxiway C. The Wilson air traffic control tower told Flight 053 to stand by for takeoff because Cessna 5Y-NNJ had been cleared for a touch-and-go landing on runway 07, which intersects runway 14. Cessna 5Y-NNJ completed the manoeuvre and the Wilson tower controller cleared Flight 053 for takeoff and issued a traffic advisory to other pilots in the vicinity that an aircraft was taking off from runway 14. The tower controller advised Flight 053 that Cessna 5Y-NNJ should be on the crosswind leg of the airfield traffic pattern. The last communication with 5Y-NNJ was that of the pilots acknowledging a warning from ATC about traffic departing on runway 14, and traffic was identified as 5Y-SLK.

Flight 053 conducted a routine takeoff from runway 14, was instructed by the Wilson tower controller to contact Nairobi approach control, and initiated contact. As the flight was climbing through an altitude of about 6,000 ft (1,800 m) mean sea level (MSL), about 530 ft (160 m) above runway elevation, the pilots heard a what they referred to as a "loud bang" and requested an immediate return to Wilson Airport. Approach control approved the request, and the pilots contacted the Wilson tower and landed safely in the opposite direction on the same runway. (Note: Runway 32 is the same runway as 14; the other number is used when taking off or landing in the opposite direction. See Runway#Naming.) All 44 people on board the aircraft were unharmed.

The Cessna, which also originated from Wilson Airport, had been flying in the airfield traffic pattern on an instructional flight for 99 Flying School, practicing touch-and-go landings on runway 07. Shortly after the collision, the Cessna crashed into the grounds of the Nairobi National Park near the airport, killing both pilots on board. The tower controller unsuccessfully tried to contact the Cessna on the radio multiple times, but with no response. The pilot of another aircraft that had departed from runway 14 behind Flight 053 told the tower controller that she had seen something "flying low" near Flight 053. Soon afterwards, the pilots of other aircraft reported spotting the wreckage of Cessna 5Y-NNJ, and the tower controller activated the crash alarm. A helicopter that was in the area landed at the crash site to offer assistance.

== Investigation ==
The Aircraft Accident Investigation Department (AAID) of the Republic of Kenya launched an investigation into the accident and issued a preliminary report.

Sections of the deicing boots on the right wing and the right horizontal stabilizer of the Dash 8 were missing when the aircraft was inspected after landing. They were found next to the Cessna crash site. The cockpit voice recorder (CVR) and flight data recorder (FDR) of the Dash 8 were not damaged and were retained by investigators for analysis.

The fuselage of the Cessna bent severely and broke into several pieces, which investigators attributed primarily to a steep nose-down ground impact. The main wreckage was found to the right of the extended centreline of runway 14, 1.663 nmi (3.080 km; 1.914 mi) inside the national park. Several sub-assemblies of the Cessna, including pieces of the horizontal stabilizers were separated from the fuselage and were found within 112.5 m (369 ft) of the main wreckage site. The Cessna did not carry, nor was it required to carry, a CVR or FDR.

Medical and pathological test results for the pilots were forthcoming when the preliminary report was issued; however, the report stated that there was "no evidence that physiological factors or incapacitation affected the performance" of the pilots of Flight 053.

== See also ==
- Ozark Air Lines Flight 965 – 1968 mid-air collision involving an airline flight and a training flight
- 1984 San Luis Obispo mid-air collision – another accident involving an airline flight and a training flight operating from the same airport
