= 1984 San Luis Obispo mid-air collision =

1984 aviation accident

Accident
- Date: August 24, 1984
- Summary: Mid-air collision due to pilot error on both aircraft
- Site: Near San Luis Obispo, California; 35°18′42″N 120°44′48″W
- Total fatalities: 17
- Total survivors: 0

First aircraft
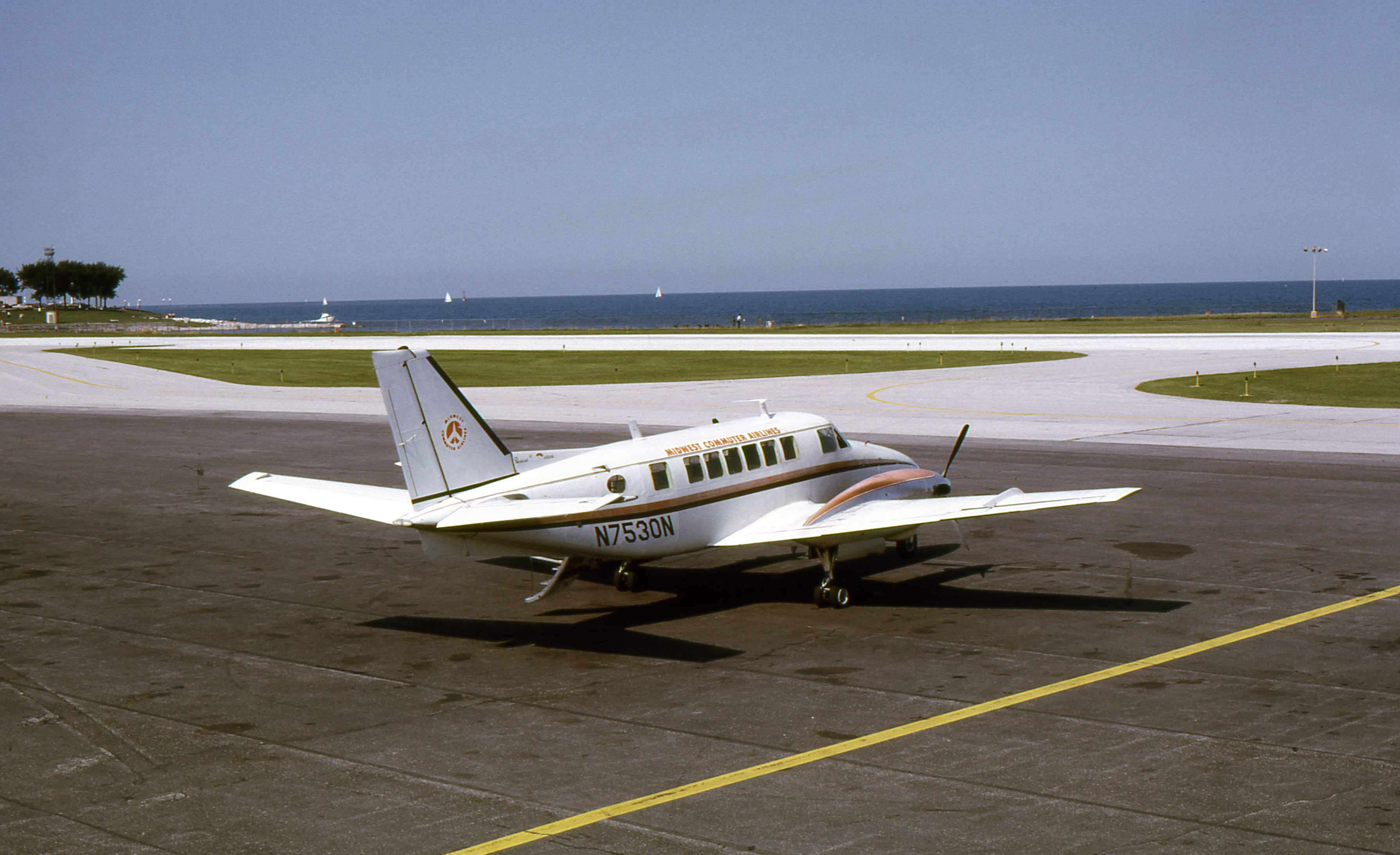
- A Beechcraft C-99 Commuter, similar to the aircraft involved in the accident.
- Type: Beechcraft C-99 Commuter
- Operator: Wings West Airlines
- IATA flight No.: RM628
- ICAO flight No.: WWM628
- Call sign: WINGS WEST 628
- Registration: N6399U
- Flight origin: San Luis Obispo-County Airport, California, United States
- Destination: San Francisco International Airport, California, United States
- Occupants: 15
- Passengers: 13
- Crew: 2
- Fatalities: 15
- Survivors: 0

Second aircraft
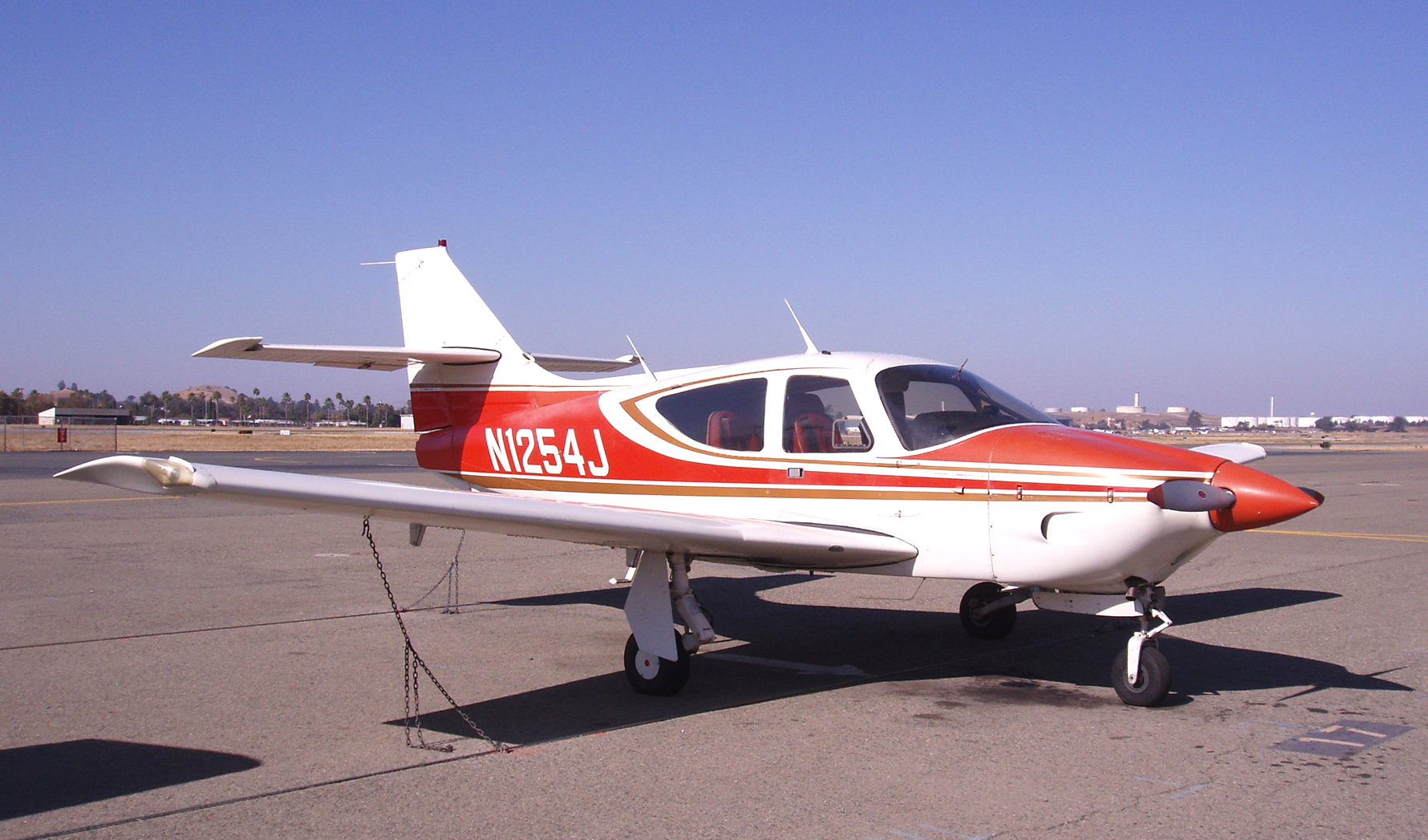
- A Rockwell Commander 112, similar to the aircraft involved in the accident.
- Type: Rockwell Commander 112
- Operator: Aesthetech Corporation (Flight school)
- Registration: N112SM
- Flight origin: Paso Robles Municipal Airport, California, United States
- Destination: Paso Robles Municipal Airport, California, United States
- Occupants: 2
- Passengers: 0
- Crew: 2
- Fatalities: 2
- Survivors: 0

The 1984 San Luis Obispo mid-air collision was an accident involving a Beechcraft C-99 Commuter and a Rockwell Commander 112 near San Luis Obispo, California, United States on August 24, 1984. None of the combined 17 passengers and crew on either aircraft survived the accident.

== Accident ==
Wings West Airlines Flight 628 was on a scheduled flight from Los Angeles, United States to San Francisco, United States with scheduled stops at Santa Maria, United States and San Luis Obispo, United States, where the aircraft picked up six and seven passengers respectively. The aircraft was flown by Captain Paul Nebolon (aged 27), who had 4,110 total flying hours including 873 hours on the Beechcraft, and co-pilot Deverl Johnson (aged 45) who had acquired 6,194 total flight hours including 62 hours on the Beechcraft. Flight 628 left the gate at San Luis Obispo-County Airport at 11.10 am, and took off from runway 29 six minutes later, bound for San Francisco. Weather at the time was clear, with a visibility of 15 miles (24.14 km).

Around the same time, a single-engined Rockwell Commander 112 which had a student and instructor onboard on an instrument training flight, had taken off from the same airport as Flight 628 at 10.55 am without a flight plan, and was now returning to the airport. While Flight 628 was climbing to 2,700 ft (823 m) at 11.16 am, the Commander had started its approach to San Luis Obispo-County Airport. At the time, both planes were flying through visual means instead of the usual IFR.

At 11.17 am and 23 seconds, Flight 628 was cleared for San Francisco and to climb and maintain an altitude of 7,000 ft (2,134 m). Fifteen seconds later, Flight 628 collided head-on with the Commander at an altitude of 3,400 ft (1,036 m). The Commander was sheared nearly in half by the collision, while Flight 628 spiraled mostly intact towards the ground, ultimately crashing north of the airport in a hilly and rural area off Highway 1, scattering flaming wreckage which ignited a 20 acre brush fire that was quickly contained. Emergency services, including a helicopter, arrived on the scene and recovered the remains of the occupants from both planes. All 17 people on both aircraft had perished. The badly mangled bodies were brought to local mortuaries that evening, where an FBI disaster team would attempt to identify the remains. The crash was the first accident for Wings West Airlines, since their founding in 1979.

== Aircraft ==
The Beechcraft C-99 Commuter involved, N6399U (msn U-187) was built in 1982 and in service of Wings West Airlines at the time of the accident. The Rockwell Commander 112 involved, N112SM was owned by the Aesthetech Corporation flight school at the time of the accident.

== Aftermath ==
Both aircraft were completely destroyed in the accident and post-crash fires. Investigators with the National Transportation Safety Board (NTSB) attributed the accident to the decisions of the pilots of both aircraft to fly under visual flight rules; had the pilots flown under instrument flight rules (IFR), air traffic control would have been warned of the imminent collision and could have instructed the pilots to take evasive action. A contributing factor was the failure of the pilots of Flight 628 to monitor local aviation radio transmissions; the pilots only monitored the appropriate radio frequency for the first 5 miles (8 km) of the journey, and therefore did not pick up transmissions from the approaching Commander. Because neither aircraft was flying IFR, air traffic controllers were not closely monitoring the aircraft flight paths. Despite clear skies and the head-on direction both planes were flying, the Beechcraft pilots would have only noticed the Commander about 10 seconds before the collision, while the Commander pilots would have only seen the Beechcraft about 6 to 8 seconds before the collision. The NTSB concluded that the time available to take evasive action was inadequate to avoid the collision.

== See also ==
- Ozark Air Lines Flight 965 – 1968 mid-air collision involving an airline flight and a training flight operating from the same airport
- Safarilink Aviation Flight 053 – 2024 mid-air collision involving an airline flight and a training flight operating from the same airport
