= Maintenance resource management =

Team approach to human error reduction in maintenance

Maintenance resource management (MRM) training is an aircraft maintenance variant on crew resource management (CRM). Although the term MRM was used for several years following CRM's introduction, the first governmental guidance for standardized MRM training and its team-based safety approach, appeared when the FAA (U.S.) issued Advisory Circular 120-72, Maintenance Resource Management Training in September, 2000.

== Overview ==
Like CRM, MRM training emphasizes a team approach to human error reduction using principles that seek to improve communications, situational awareness, problem solving, decision making, and teamwork. Unlike traditional coercive and hierarchical top-down safety programs, MRM advocates a decentralized, human-centric approach to safety. MRM encourages work teams to communicate vital operational risk and safety information directly and informally, regardless of rank or position, thus permitting rapid response to prevent impending crises.

Some variation of human factors training, whether called MRM or not, is now standard at many commercial airlines, aircraft manufacturers, and aviation-related organizations. Several commercial aviation firms, as well as international aviation safety agencies, began expanding CRM-style training into air traffic control, aircraft design, and aircraft maintenance in the 1990s. Specifically, the aircraft maintenance section of this training expansion gained traction as Maintenance Resource Management (MRM). In an effort to standardize the industry wide training of this team-based safety approach, the FAA (U.S.) issued Advisory Circular 120-72, Maintenance Resource Management Training in September, 2000, and more recently an MRM Results Evaluation Calculator.

== MRM in military aviation ==
In 2002, the U.S. Coast Guard identified that maintenance error is involved in one of five Coast Guard aviation mishaps at an annual cost of $1 million. In an effort to reduce those maintenance error induced mishaps, the Coast Guard created a Human Factors in Maintenance (HFIM) program. Drawing on data from the Federal Aviation Administration, National Aeronautics and Space Administration, National Transportation Safety Board, and commercial airline sources, the Coast Guard finally implemented a U.S. Navy-developed variant of MRM.

Following a study of aviation mishaps over the 10-year period 1992-2002, the U.S. Air Force determined that close to 18% of its aircraft mishaps were directly attributable to maintenance human error. Unlike the more immediate impact of air crew error, maintenance human errors often occur long before the flight where the problems are discovered. These "latent errors" included such mistakes as failure to follow published aircraft manuals, lack of assertive communication among maintenance technicians, poor supervision, and improper assembly practices.

In summer 2005, the Air National Guard Aviation Safety Division made the MRM program available to the Air National Guard's 88 flying wings, spread across 54 U.S. states and territories. In 2006, the Defense Safety Oversight Council (DSOC) of the U.S. Department of Defense recognized the mishap prevention value of this maintenance safety program by partially funding a variant of ANG MRM for training throughout the U.S. Air Force. This ANG initiated, DoD-funded version of MRM became known as Air Force Maintenance Resource Management, AF-MRM, and is now widely used in the U.S. Air Force.

== See also ==
- Fatigue
- Human factors
- Foreign Object Damage
- Disruptive Solutions Process
