= Scud (cloud) =

Clouds supplementary feature

Pannus
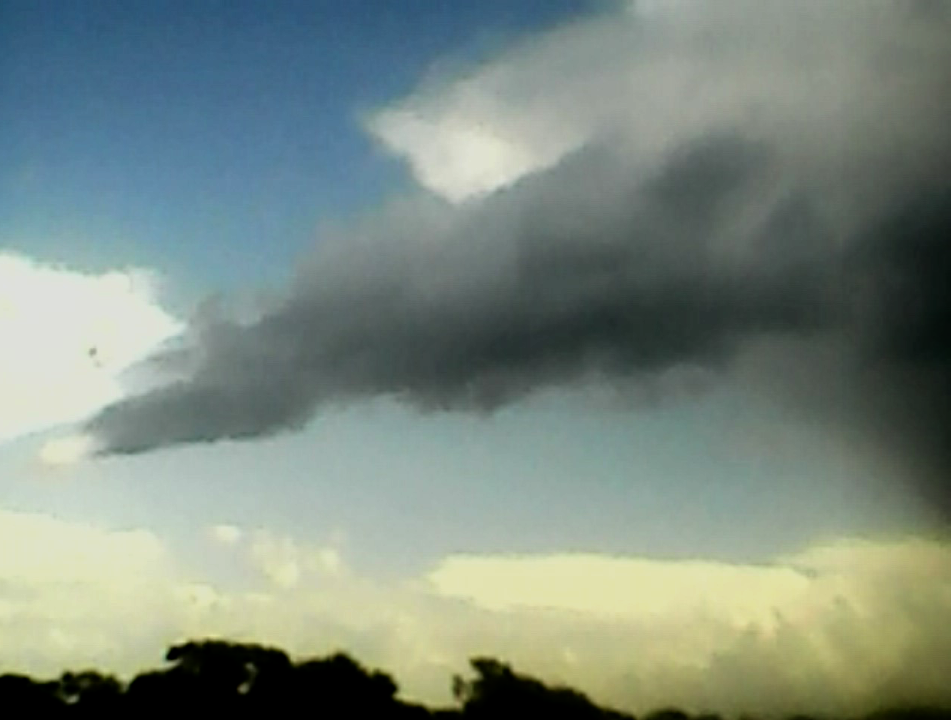
- A scud cloud near the ground
- Abbreviation: Scud/Pan
- Genus: Altostratus, Nimbostratus, Cumulus, Cumulonimbus
- Altitude: 200-16,000 m (1,000-52,000 ft)
- Classification: Family D (Vertically developed)
- Appearance: Ragged frazzles, scud
- Precipitation: No, but may appear under precipitating clouds.

Pannus, or scud clouds, is a type of fractus cloud at low height above ground, detached, and of irregular form, found beneath nimbostratus, cumulonimbus, altostratus and cumulus clouds. These clouds are often ragged or wispy in appearance. When caught in the outflow (downdraft) beneath a thunderstorm, scud clouds will often move faster than the storm clouds themselves. If the parent cloud that scud clouds pair with were to suddenly dissipate, the pannus cloud accessory would not be able to be told apart from a fractus cloud formation.

When in an inflow (updraft) area, scud clouds tend to rise and may exhibit lateral movement ranging from very little to substantial.

== Formation ==
Pannus clouds are formed as the warmer (and often more moist) updraft of a thunderstorm lifts the relatively warm air near the surface. These clouds condense as the warm, moist air saturates through ascent and is pushed outward from the storm. Scud clouds are very commonly found on the leading edge of a storm front. In this area of a storm, scud are commonly associated with shelf clouds.

Pannus clouds may also form when an updraft ingests precipitation-cooled air from the downdraft. Scud forming in this region of the storm, if moving laterally, will tend to move inward towards the dominant updraft. Rising scud may condense and organize into a wall cloud. The key to differentiating between a scud cloud, wall cloud, or funnel cloud is to find signs of rotation or to determine if they are attached to the base of the thunderstorm.

Pannus clouds can often be mistaken for a developing tornado, landspout, or waterspout. The difference is determinable by observing the presence or absence of rotation (not just movement) of the scud clouds. If rotation is present, then a tornado, landspout, or waterspout is possible, and the more intense the rotation, the more likely.

== See also ==
- Scud running
- List of cloud types
