= Scud running =

Aviation term

In general aviation, scud running is a practice in which pilots lower their altitude to avoid clouds or instrument meteorological conditions (IMC). The goal of scud running is to stay clear of weather to continue flying with visual, rather than instrument, references. This practice is widely accepted to be dangerous, and has led to death in many cases from pilots flying into terrain or obstacles, such as masts and towers, normally referred to as controlled flight into terrain; even instrument-rated pilots sometimes elect to take the risk to avoid icing or embedded thunderstorms in cloud, or in situations where the minimum instrument altitudes are too high for their aircraft.

Scud running is occasionally described as "maintaining visual contact with the ground while avoiding physical contact with it" or "if the weather's too bad to go IFR, we'll go VFR." A procedure under instrument flight rules (IFR), called a contact approach, is often referred to as a form of "legalized" scud running.

The term gets its name from scud, which is used to describe small, ragged, low cloud fragments that are unattached to a larger cloud base, and often seen with and behind cold fronts and thunderstorm gust fronts.

== Canadian regulations ==
In Canada, the visibility and altitude requirements are similar to those in the U.S., but most controlled airspace outside of terminal areas bottoms out at 2,200 feet (670 m) Above Ground Level (AGL), so there is more room to scud run legally. In northern Canada, there is little controlled airspace at all, below the high-level class A airspace.

== US regulations ==
In the United States, most controlled airspace below 10,000 ft (3,000 m) MSL requires a pilot flying under VFR to remain 500 ft (150 m) below a cloud ceiling and to maintain 3 statute miles (4.8 km) visibility. Outside of airport control zones and major terminal areas, however, controlled airspace typically begins at 1,200 feet (370 m) above ground level; below that is uncontrolled (class G) airspace, where (at that altitude) a pilot is required only to remain clear of clouds and to maintain 1 statute mile (1.6 km) visibility. Flying in the airspace above the tree line, yet below 1,200 feet (370 m) is considered "scud running" where land ownership rights ends at the height of the property tree line.
