= Contact approach =

Type of approach for aircraft

A contact approach is an approach available to aircraft operating on an instrument flight rules (IFR) flight plan, where the pilot may deviate from the published instrument approach procedure (IAP) and proceed to the destination airport by visual reference to the surface. It is similar to a visual approach, except that the pilot is neither required to have the destination airport nor preceding aircraft in sight at all times during the approach. Also, the visibility requirements are less stringent.

== Overview ==
In the United States, only pilots may initiate a request for this type of approach; regulations prohibit air traffic control (ATC) from asking pilots to perform them. A contact approach will only be issued if the aircraft operates clear of clouds with at least 1 statute mile (1.6 km) of flight visibility, with a reasonable expectation of continuing to the destination airport under those conditions. Additionally, the reported ground visibility at the destination airport must be at least 1 statute mile (1.6 km).

In executing a contact approach, the pilot is responsible for obstruction clearance, but ATC will still provide separation from other IFR or special VFR traffic. If radar service is being received, it will automatically terminate when the pilot is instructed to change to the airport's advisory frequency. The pilot must advise ATC immediately if unable to continue the contact approach or if they encounter less than 1 statute mile (1.6 km) of flight visibility; ATC will then provide new instructions. Also, ATC may issue alternative instructions if, in their judgment, weather conditions may make completion of the approach impracticable. ATC seldom permits a contact approach in complex, busy airspace like that typically found around major commercial airports.

== Purpose ==
The contact approach can be a time- and fuel-saving method of working the ATC system to a pilot's advantage. However, executing a contact approach in marginal visibility is similar to scud running–a dangerous practice–and can frighten or disorient inexperienced pilots. In such conditions, experts advise it should only be attempted by pilots intimately familiar with the destination airport, surrounding terrain, and prevailing weather, and whose experience suggests the approach can be completed safely. As a contact approach involves deviation from an IAP, standard missed approach procedures from the IAP do not apply, and ATC may issue a lengthy and unpredictable reroute if the contact approach is broken off. This may negate its potential advantages.

The Aeronautical Information Manual (AIM), published by the Federal Aviation Administration (FAA), emphasizes that the contact approach is a substitute for an IAP only where one exists. A contact approach may neither be used as an improvised IFR approach to an airport that lacks an IAP entirely nor to approach one airport, break off the approach when visual conditions are encountered, and then fly to another airport.

== See also ==
- Visual approach
- Instrument approach
- Night VFR (NVFR)
- Special visual flight rules (SVFR)
- Visual flight rules § Controlled visual flight rules (CVFR)
