= Big sky theory =

Theory in aviation

In aviation, the Big Sky Theory is that two randomly flying bodies are very unlikely to collide, as three-dimensional space is so large relative to the bodies. Some aviation safety rules involving altimetry and navigation standards are based on this concept. It does not apply when aircraft are flying along specific narrow routes, such as an airport traffic pattern or jet airway.

The Big Sky Theory has been mathematically modeled, using a gas law approach. This implies that collisions of aircraft in free flight should be extremely rare in en-route airspace, whereas operational errors such as violations of formal separation standards should be relatively common. Three critical parameters are the number of flying objects per unit volume, their speed, and their size. Larger, faster objects, flying in a traffic-rich environment are more collision-prone.

== Military aviation tactics ==
The theory is also relevant in military aviation tactics, especially regarding targeting of aircraft and missiles by ground-based, non-guided weapons without visual spotting. For example, consider an F-16, which has a combined fuselage/wing area of roughly 670 square feet (62.2 square metres), and flying at 6,000 feet (1,829 metres) at night or above clouds. Ground-based, non-guided antiaircraft guns are firing randomly hoping to hit it. Their maximum slant range is 10,000 feet (3,048 metres).

There are 20,626 square degrees in the visible sky hemisphere, assuming no horizon obstructions. The 670 square ft (≈62 m²) aircraft would subtend an angle of 0.24 degrees at 6,000 ft (≈1,800 m). Therefore, the chance of a single randomly fired unguided shot hitting the aircraft would be one in 20626 / 0.24 / 0.24, or one in 358,090.

Targeted firing reduces these odds. By sound or by guessing, isolating the firing region to about one fifth of the sky might be possible. If you assume 10 guns firing 10 rounds per second over one fifth of the sky, perfectly coordinating their firing evenly across that region, and crudely tracking the aircraft as it flies over, the chance of hitting it would be 358,090 / 5 / 10 / 10, or one chance in 716 each second.

Flying at 500 mph or 805 km/h (733 ft/s or 223 m/s), each second the aircraft would cross seven angular degrees of sky. With a 10,000 ft (≈3,000 m) slant range, the anti-aircraft guns could cover a cone of sky 100 degrees wide, assuming a common gun location. Therefore, the aircraft would be within range for 100/7 or 14.3 seconds, and the total chance of hitting it during a single flyover pass would be 716 / 14.3 or one chance in 50.

When coordinating corridors for friendly artillery trajectories through airspace, it is sometimes assumed (rarely, and for emergency expediency) that similar unlikelinesses apply. This is often referred to as the "Big Sky - Small Bomb" theory.

== Space warfare ==
Space warfare tactics are also affected by the Big Sky Theory, if unguided projectiles are used. At the vast engagement distances, the subtended angle of the target would be minuscule, and the projectile flight time to target would be great, possibly on the order of an hour or more. If the target vehicle randomly maneuvered every few minutes, the chance of a hit would be extremely small, even if many projectiles were fired. A space weapon using unguided kinetic projectiles flew on the Soviet Almaz military space station.

== Big ocean theory ==
There is a related marine concept called the big ocean theory. It holds that two randomly placed, randomly maneuvering vessels in an ocean are very unlikely to collide.

== See also ==
- Kessler syndrome
- Mid-air collision
