= Systempunkt =

A systempunkt ("system point") is a type of critical, vulnerable point in a system. The system may be a physical system (such as computer network) but the term is usually used when referring to a market (e. g., the French steel market, international flax market, etc.)

A systempunkt is a point in such a system vulnerable to disruption by many small interactions, such that a swarm of disruptions and attacks will cascade through the system and collapse it, possibly resulting in financial loss, supply shortages, or destabilization.

== Examples ==
A systempunkt may be vulnerable to operational failure, but it is not vulnerable because of its own operation or location. Rather, its operation interacts through communication, exchange or movement of objects and these disrupted dependencies of flows – of data or goods – will be the failure when it is no longer operating. The effects on the network are more significant than those on the specific object.

Computer servers that fail from a Denial of service attack may no longer support the application or user base that depends on them; this is an example of an attack on a systempunkt.

A Systempunkt attack can be related to simple sabotage. But has a more grandiose objective: collapse of a dependent network or state social order.

A theoretical example might be if coal miners of a country went out on strike. This could cause a coal shortage which, cascading through the economy, could force a partial collapse, ultimately forcing desired major social changes.

== Etymology ==
The term was coined by John Robb.

The etymology is modern and is a portmanteau word derived from the German term 'schwerpunkt' and the English language word 'system'. The German term from Blitzkrieg warfare's schwerpunkt literally means 'heavy point' and is often translated as centre of gravity or focal point. It is used here in relation to its military context of use, in which it describes the focal point of an attack against an enemy line, usually at some vulnerable part of that line, which will lead to the collapse in the enemy line of defense. But whereas a schwerpunkt focuses on a single object of attack, the Systempunkt is representative of network effects. A link may fail, not necessarily the weakest, but the effects on the network may continue to cascade, as an avalanche effect that spreads throughout the system. Repercussions may be continuous, and exhibit repeating failures that have aftershocks for the whole network.

Descriptively, systempunkt has some similarities to Heinz Guderian's adage "Nicht kleckern, klotzen!" ("Don't fiddle, smash!") though it reverses the intent and effect and intends to actualize cascading events through domino type dependencies. In practice, "Fiddle [with the systempunkt] until it [the system] smashes".
