= Pilot flying =

Pilot operating the flight controls

In commercial aviation with a two-person flight crew, the pilot flying (PF) is the pilot operating the flight controls of the aircraft. The other pilot is referred to as the pilot monitoring (PM) or pilot not flying (PNF). Before a flight departs, the pilot in command must decide who the pilot flying and pilot monitoring will be for the remainder of the flight, or for any specific phase of flight (e.g., takeoff, approach, or landing). Typically, the flight crew swap roles on the return leg.
