= Special visual flight rules =

Set of aviation regulations under which a pilot may operate an aircraft

Special visual flight rules (also special VFR or SVFR) are a set of aviation regulations under which a pilot may operate an aircraft. It is a special case of operating under visual flight rules (VFR).

== Use in different regions ==
The definition for SVFR may be different in different countries, depending on the local aviation regulations.

=== ICAO definition ===
The ICAO definition of Special VFR flight is a VFR flight cleared by air traffic control to operate within a control zone in meteorological conditions below visual meteorological conditions.

=== United States ===
According to Federal Aviation Regulations, SVFR operations can only be conducted in the controlled airspace around an airport where that controlled airspace extends down to the surface (so-called surface area). SVFR can only be conducted below 10,000 feet MSL in such areas.

SVFR at night requires an IFR-equipped aircraft and an IFR-rated pilot in command ("IFR" means Instrument flight rules). In helicopters, there is no minimum flight visibility requirement, or a requirement for an IFR-equipped aircraft or an IFR-rated pilot in command.

=== Other countries ===
Flight under SVFR is only allowed in controlled airspace, and always requires clearance from air traffic control (ATC). It usually happens when the aircraft is inside controlled airspace, and the local weather is less than the minimums required for flight under visual flight rules (VFR) within the airspace in question.

Note that an aircraft might be able to fly under SVFR even in Class A airspace, where instrument flight rules (IFR) flight is the norm.

== Equipment requirements and weather minimums ==
The aircraft need not necessarily be equipped for flight under IFR, and the aircraft must remain clear of clouds with the surface in sight, and maintain a certain flight visibility minimum (1,500 metres according to ICAO, one statute mile in the US, 1,500 m visibility, in sight of surface and clear of cloud in Europe). The pilot continues to be responsible for obstacle and terrain clearance.

(US) Weather minimums for SVFR are ground visibility of one statute mile (except helicopters) (when ground visibility is not reported, flight visibility of one statute mile) and clear of clouds. Operations must be conducted between sunrise and sunset (except helicopters and in Alaska). Flight under a SVFR clearance at night requires the pilot to have an instrument rating and the aircraft must be IFR equipped.

An example of the use of SVFR is when a flight wishes to leave an airport in controlled airspace, to fly VFR in uncontrolled airspace, when the visibility is below the minimum for VFR flight in the control zone but not below the lower minimum for VFR flight in uncontrolled airspace. SVFR is never offered by Air Traffic Control. It must be requested by the Pilot in Command.

== See also ==
- Visual flight rules
