= Mid-air collision =

Aviation accident with unplanned contact

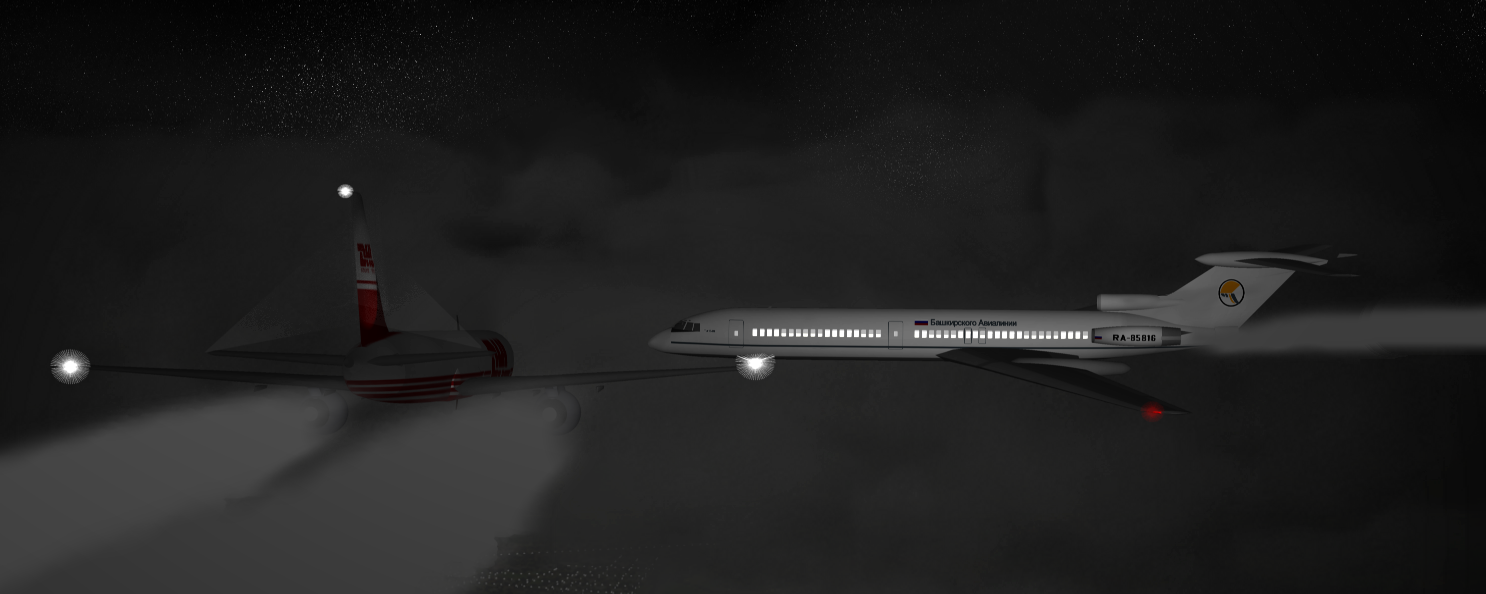
CGI rendering of the 2002 Überlingen mid-air collision

In aviation, a mid-air collision is an accident in which two or more aircraft come into unplanned contact during flight and collide with each other.

The potential for a mid-air collision is increased by miscommunication, mistrust, error in navigation, deviations from flight plans, lack of situational awareness, and the lack of collision-avoidance systems. Although a rare occurrence in general due to the vastness of open space available, collisions often happen near or at airports, where large volumes of aircraft are spaced more closely than in general flight.

The deadliest mid-air collision occurred on 12 November 1996, when a Boeing 747 operated by Saudia collided with an Ilyushin IL-76 operated by Kazakhstan Airlines near Charkhi Dadri, India. The crash, in total, killed all 349 people.

== First recorded collision ==
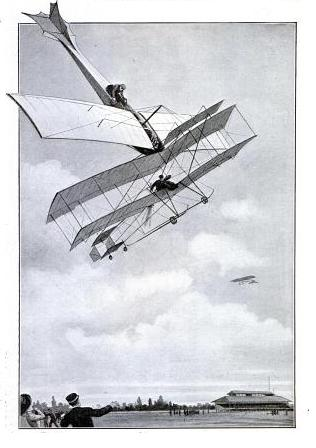
Contemporary artist's impression of the first mid-air collision, 1910

The first recorded collision between aircraft occurred at the "Milano Circuito Aereo Internazionale" meeting held between 24 September and 3 October 1910 in Milan, Italy. On 3 October, Frenchman René Thomas, flying the Antoinette IV monoplane, collided with British Army Captain Bertram Dickson by ramming his Farman III biplane in the rear. Both pilots survived, but Dickson was so badly injured that he never flew again.

The first fatal collision occurred over La Brayelle Airfield, Douai, France, on 19 June 1912. Captain Marcel Dubois and Lieutenant Albert Peignan, both of the French Army, crashed into one another in an early-morning haze, killing both pilots.

== Traffic collision avoidance system ==
Almost all modern large aircraft (and many smaller, general aviation aircraft) are fitted with a traffic collision avoidance system (TCAS), which is designed to try to prevent mid-air collisions. The system, based on the signals from aircraft transponders, alerts pilots if a potential collision with another aircraft is imminent. Despite its limitations, it is believed to have greatly reduced mid-air collisions.

== United States ==
Bobbie R. Allen, Director of Aviation Safety at the NTSB:
"We've had the potential of mid-air collisions ever since Wilbur turned to Orville and said, 'Let's build another one.'"

On some occasions, military aircraft conducting training flights inadvertently collide with civilian aircraft. The 1958 collision between United Air Lines Flight 736 and a fighter jet, and another U.S. military/civilian crash one month later involving Capital Airlines Flight 300, hastened the signing of the Federal Aviation Act of 1958 into law. The act created the Federal Aviation Agency (later renamed the Federal Aviation Administration), and provided unified control of airspace for both civil and military flights. In 2005, in an effort to reduce such military/civilian mid-air collisions in U.S. airspace, the Air National Guard Flight Safety Division, led by Lt Col Edward Vaughan, used the disruptive solutions process to create a website called See and Avoid. It operated until January 2017.

One of the first mid-air collisions that happened in the United States took place at Chicago's Cicero Field on September 14, 1912. Howard W. Gill had taken off before dusk in a Wright EX single-seat biplane and fellow pilot George Mestache of France, flying a Morane-Borel, had taken off after dark. Participants at this flying meet were not supposed to be in the air together after dark and during the event for night flying. Mestache ascended into the air before Gill had finished, Mestache's landing gear connected with Gill's plane causing both machines to crash. Mestache survived as did Gill initially, but Gill died on the way to the hospital.

== See also ==
- 2001 Japan Airlines mid-air incident – a near-miss incident between two commercial aircraft
- "ABQ", an episode of Breaking Bad that revolves around a mid-air collision
- Automatic dependent surveillance – broadcast (ADS-B)
- Big sky theory
- Bird strike – a collision between an aircraft and an airborne animal
- Disruptive solutions process
- Ground collision – including a list of aircraft collisions on the ground
- List of UAV-related incidents – for non-fatal collisions involving manned aircraft and unmanned aerial vehicles
- Near miss (safety)
- Portable collision avoidance system (PCAS)
- Reduced vertical separation minima (RVSM)
- Runway incursion
- Traffic collision avoidance system (TCAS)
