= Robert Sumwalt =

Robert Sumwalt may refer to:

- Robert L. Sumwalt (academic) (1895–1977), American engineer and academic
- Robert L. Sumwalt (entrepreneur) (1927–2016), businessman, developer, and son of the academic
- Robert L. Sumwalt (U.S. government official) (born c. 1950s), pilot, chairman of the National Transportation Safety Board, and son of the entrepreneur
