= Sumwalt =

Surname and people who have it

Sumwalt is a surname derived as a variation of the surname Zumwalt.

People having this surname include:

- Barbara Lathan Sumwalt, founder of the Barbara Sumwalt Museum on Useppa Island
- Charles L. K. Sumwalt, a Colonel in the 138th Pennsylvania Infantry during the American Civil War
- James Sumwalt, one of the six co-founders of American computer game development company, Human Head Studios
- Joshua B. Sumwalt, a partner in the quarrying of the Woodstock Quartz Monzonite deposit
- Robert L. Sumwalt (academic) (1895–1977) at the University of South Carolina
- Robert L. Sumwalt (entrepreneur), Jr. (born 1928; fl. 2003), architect, developer, and son of the academic
- Robert L. Sumwalt (NTSB), III (born c. 1950s), pilot, member of the National Transportation Safety Board, and son of the entrepreneur
