= Collier Trophy Selection 2011 =

The Robert J. Collier Trophy is owned and administered by the National Aeronautic Association and is awarded annually "for the greatest achievement in aeronautics or astronautics in America, with respect to improving the performance, efficiency, and safety of air or space vehicles, the value of which has been thoroughly demonstrated by actual use during the preceding year."

== Nominations ==
The four nominations were:

- Boeing 787 Dreamliner
- C-5M Super Galaxy
- The Gamera Human-Powered Helicopter
- Taurus G-4 Electric-Powered Aircraft

== Selection Committee ==
On February 2, 2012, the National Aeronautic Association announced the nominations as well as the Selection Committee.

The Selection Committee consisted of:

- Walter Boyne, Chairman of the National Aeronautic Association and Chairman of the 2011 Collier Selection Committee
- Dick Rutan, Collier Recipient (1986)
- Joe Lombardo, Gulfstream Aerospace, Collier Recipient/Gulfstream V (2003)
- The Honorable Bobby Sturgell, Rockwell Collins, Collier Recipient/ADSB (2008)
- Jeff Pino, Sikorsky Aircraft Corporation, Collier Recipient/X2 (2010)
- Richard Aboulafia, The Teal Group
- Monte Belger, Aero Club of Washington
- The Honorable Marion Blakey, Aerospace Industries Association
- Bob Blouin, Hawker Beechcraft
- Ed Bolen, National Business Aviation Association
- Pete Bunce, General Aviation Manufacturers Association
- Steve Callaghan, National Aviation Club Committee of NAA
- Steve Champness, Aero Club of Atlanta
- David Coleal, Spirit AeroSystems
- Brian Glackin, Cobham
- Mathew Greene, Safe Flight Instrument
- Leo Knaapen, Bombardier
- John Langford, Aurora Flight Sciences
- Dave Manke, United Technologies
- Mary Miller, Signature Flight Support/BBA Aviation
- Stan O’Conner, GE Aviation
- Steve Plummer, Rolls-Royce, North America
- Skip Ringo, DRS
- Bob Rubino, Lockheed Martin
- Ed Scott, United States Parachute Association
- Bob Stangarone, Embraer
- Al Tyler, Soaring Society of America
- Mark Van Tine, Jeppesen
- Tony Velocci, Aviation Week and Space Technology
- Bob Vilhaeur, Boeing
- Diane White, Cessna Aircraft Company
- Jonathan Gaffney, President and CEO of NAA, Director (Non-Voting Member)

== Presenters ==
=== C-5M Galaxy ===
- Major Gen Wayne Schatz, Director - Strategic Plans, Requirements and Programs, Headquarters Air Mobility Command, Scott Air Force Base, Illinois
- Lt. Colonel Craig Harmon, Commander, 9th Airlift Squadron, Dover Air Force Base, Delaware

=== Gamera Human Powered Helicopter ===
- Ben Berry, PhD student, Alfred Gessow Rotorcraft Center, Dept. of Aerospace Engineering, University of Maryland
- Joe Schmaus, PhD student, Alfred Gessow Rotorcraft Center, Dept. of Aerospace Engineering, University of Maryland

=== Team Pipistrel-USA ===
- Dr. Jack Langelaan, Assistant Professor, Aerospace Engineering, Penn State
- Dr. Mark Maughmer, Professor, Aerospace Engineering, Penn State

=== Boeing 787 ===
- Jim Albaugh, President and CEO, Commercial Airplanes, The Boeing Company
- Scott Fancher, Vice President and General Manager, 787 Program

== Process ==
The Collier Selection Committee will meet on Monday, March 13, 2012 in Arlington, Virginia.

The Recipient will be announced on Tuesday, March 14.
