= Ellen Conners =

American politician

Ellen Engleman Conners
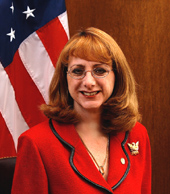

Chair of the National Transportation Safety Board
- In office March 24, 2003 – March 2006
- President: George W. Bush
- Preceded by: Marion Blakey
- Succeeded by: Mark Rosenker

Ellen Engleman Conners was an American politician who was the Chair of the National Transportation Safety Board from 2003 to 2006. She graduated from Indiana University Bloomington (BA and JD) and Harvard Kennedy School (MPA).
