= Flight 159 =

Flight 159 may refer to:

- TWA Flight 159, crashed on 6 November 1967
- Daallo Airlines Flight 159, successfully landed after on-board explosion, 2 February 2016
