= Patricia Goldman =

Patricia Goldman may refer to:

- Patricia A. Goldman (1942–2023), American public servant and activist
- Patricia Goldman-Rakic (1937–2003), American neuroscientist
