= Goglia =

Goglia (pronounced [ˈɡoʎʎa]) is an Italian surname from Campania, possibly derived from a medieval given name or from the occupation of a grafter, referring to the local name of a plant used to bind grafts. Notable people with the surname include:

- Erika Eleniak (born 1969), briefly known as Erika Eleniak-Goglia, American-Canadian actress and model
- John Goglia (born 1944), American aviation safety consultant
- Juliette Goglia, American actress, singer and musician
