= List of members of the National Transportation Safety Board =

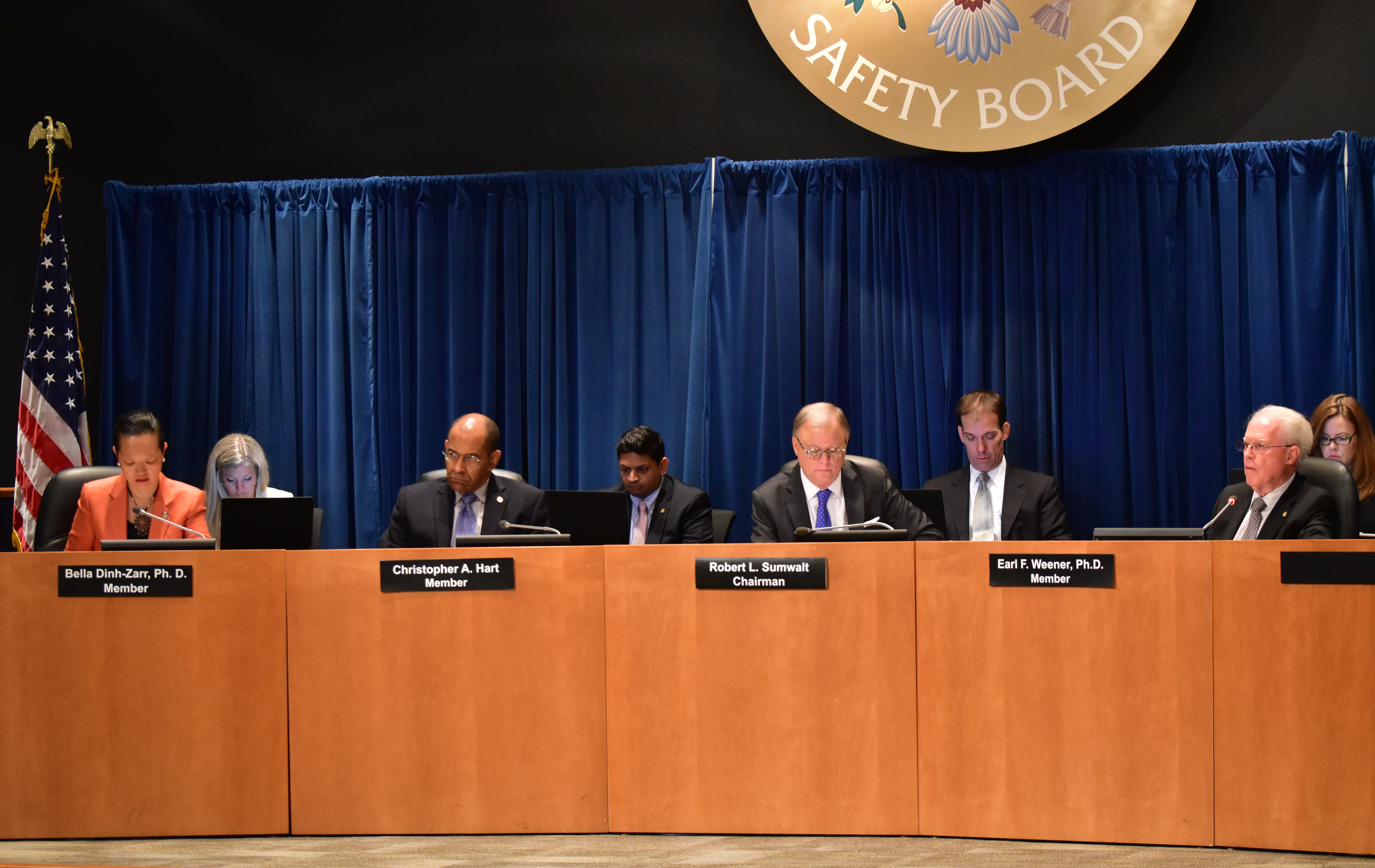
NTSB in September 2017

The five members of the National Transportation Safety Board each serve five-year terms after they are nominated by the president of the United States and confirmed by the United States Senate. One member is designated by the president to serve as chairman and another as vice chairman; each serves a two-year term in those capacities. The chairman is required to undergo a separate Senate confirmation hearing. When there is no designated chairman, the vice chairman serves as the acting chairman.

== Members ==
- Chair
- Vice Chair
- Chair and Vice Chair

List of members of the National Transportation Safety Board
Year	Member	Member	Member	Member	Member
1967	Joseph J. O'Connell (Note: Chair of NTSB.); 1967–69 (Note: Served as 1st Chair from 1967–69.)	John H. Reed; 1967–76 (Note: Served as 2nd Chair from 1970–76.)	Oscar M. Laurel; 1967–72	Louis M. Thayer; 1967–76	Francis H. McAdams; 1967–83
1968	Joseph J. O'Connell; 1967–69	John H. Reed; 1967–76	Oscar M. Laurel; 1967–72	Louis M. Thayer; 1967–76	Francis H. McAdams; 1967–83
1969	Joseph J. O'Connell; 1967–69	John H. Reed; 1967–76	Oscar M. Laurel; 1967–72	Louis M. Thayer; 1967–76	Francis H. McAdams; 1967–83
1969	Isabel A. Burgess; 1969–76	John H. Reed; 1967–76	Oscar M. Laurel; 1967–72	Louis M. Thayer; 1967–76	Francis H. McAdams; 1967–83
1970	Isabel A. Burgess; 1969–76	John H. Reed; 1967–76	Oscar M. Laurel; 1967–72	Louis M. Thayer; 1967–76	Francis H. McAdams; 1967–83
1971	Isabel A. Burgess; 1969–76	John H. Reed; 1967–76	Oscar M. Laurel; 1967–72	Louis M. Thayer; 1967–76	Francis H. McAdams; 1967–83
1972	Isabel A. Burgess; 1969–76	John H. Reed; 1967–76	Oscar M. Laurel; 1967–72	Louis M. Thayer; 1967–76	Francis H. McAdams; 1967–83
1972	Isabel A. Burgess; 1969–76	John H. Reed; 1967–76	William R. Haley; 1972–77	Louis M. Thayer; 1967–76	Francis H. McAdams; 1967–83
1973	Isabel A. Burgess; 1969–76	John H. Reed; 1967–76	William R. Haley; 1972–77	Louis M. Thayer; 1967–76	Francis H. McAdams; 1967–83
1974	Isabel A. Burgess; 1969–76	John H. Reed; 1967–76	William R. Haley; 1972–77	Louis M. Thayer; 1967–76	Francis H. McAdams; 1967–83
1975	Isabel A. Burgess; 1969–76	John H. Reed; 1967–76	William R. Haley; 1972–77	Louis M. Thayer; 1967–76	Francis H. McAdams; 1967–83
1976	Isabel A. Burgess; 1969–76	John H. Reed; 1967–76	William R. Haley; 1972–77	Louis M. Thayer; 1967–76	Francis H. McAdams; 1967–83
1976	Kay Bailey (Note: Vice Chair of NTSB.); 1976–78 (Note: Served as Vice Chair from 1976–78.)	Webster B. Todd Jr. 1976–79 (Note: Served as 3rd Chair of NTSB from 1976–78.)	William R. Haley; 1972–77	Philip A. Hogue; 1976–79	Francis H. McAdams; 1967–83
1977	Kay Bailey; 1976–78	Webster B. Todd Jr. 1976–79	William R. Haley; 1972–77	Philip A. Hogue; 1976–79	Francis H. McAdams; 1967–83
1977	Kay Bailey; 1976–78	Webster B. Todd Jr. 1976–79	James B. King; 1977–82 (Note: Served as 4th Chair from 1978–82.)	Philip A. Hogue; 1976–79	Francis H. McAdams; 1967–83
1978	Kay Bailey; 1976–78	Webster B. Todd Jr. 1976–79	James B. King; 1977–82	Philip A. Hogue; 1976–79	Francis H. McAdams; 1967–83
1978	Elwood T. Driver; 1978–81 (Note: Served as Vice Chair from 1978–81.)	Webster B. Todd Jr. 1976–79	James B. King; 1977–82	Philip A. Hogue; 1976–79	Francis H. McAdams; 1967–83
1979	Elwood T. Driver; 1978–81	Webster B. Todd Jr. 1976–79	James B. King; 1977–82	Philip A. Hogue; 1976–79	Francis H. McAdams; 1967–83
1979	Elwood T. Driver; 1978–81	Patricia A. Goldman; 1979–88 (Note: Served as Vice Chair from 1982–88.)	James B. King; 1977–82	G.H. Patrick Bursley; 1979–85	Francis H. McAdams; 1967–83
1980	Elwood T. Driver; 1978–81	Patricia A. Goldman; 1979–88	James B. King; 1977–82	G.H. Patrick Bursley; 1979–85	Francis H. McAdams; 1967–83
1981	Elwood T. Driver; 1978–81	Patricia A. Goldman; 1979–88	James B. King; 1977–82	G.H. Patrick Bursley; 1979–85	Francis H. McAdams; 1967–83
1981	James E. Burnett Jr. 1981–91 (Note: Served as 5th Chair from 1982–88.)	Patricia A. Goldman; 1979–88	James B. King; 1977–82	G.H. Patrick Bursley; 1979–85	Francis H. McAdams; 1967–83
1982	James E. Burnett Jr. 1981–91	Patricia A. Goldman; 1979–88	James B. King; 1977–82	G.H. Patrick Bursley; 1979–85	Francis H. McAdams; 1967–83
1982	James E. Burnett Jr. 1981–91	Patricia A. Goldman; 1979–88	Donald D. Engen; 1982–84	G.H. Patrick Bursley; 1979–85	Francis H. McAdams; 1967–83
1983	James E. Burnett Jr. 1981–91	Patricia A. Goldman; 1979–88	Donald D. Engen; 1982–84	G.H. Patrick Bursley; 1979–85	Francis H. McAdams; 1967–83
1983	James E. Burnett Jr. 1981–91	Patricia A. Goldman; 1979–88	Donald D. Engen; 1982–84	G.H. Patrick Bursley; 1979–85	Vernon L. Grose; 1983–84
1984	James E. Burnett Jr. 1981–91	Patricia A. Goldman; 1979–88	Donald D. Engen; 1982–84	G.H. Patrick Bursley; 1979–85	Vernon L. Grose; 1983–84
1984	James E. Burnett Jr. 1981–91	Patricia A. Goldman; 1979–88	[vacant]	G.H. Patrick Bursley; 1979–85	[vacant]
1985	James E. Burnett Jr. 1981–91	Patricia A. Goldman; 1979–88	[vacant]	G.H. Patrick Bursley; 1979–85	[vacant]
1985	James E. Burnett Jr. 1981–91	Patricia A. Goldman; 1979–88	[vacant]	John K. Lauber; 1985–95	[vacant]
1986	James E. Burnett Jr. 1981–91	Patricia A. Goldman; 1979–88	[vacant]	John K. Lauber; 1985–95	[vacant]
1986	James E. Burnett Jr. 1981–91	Patricia A. Goldman; 1979–88	Joseph T. Nall; 1986–89 (Note: Died during a plane crash in 1989.)	John K. Lauber; 1985–95	[vacant]
1987	James E. Burnett Jr. 1981–91	Patricia A. Goldman; 1979–88	Joseph T. Nall; 1986–89	John K. Lauber; 1985–95	[vacant]
1987	James E. Burnett Jr. 1981–91	Patricia A. Goldman; 1979–88	Joseph T. Nall; 1986–89	John K. Lauber; 1985–95	James L. Kolstad; 1987–92 (Note: Served as 6th Chair from 1990–92 and, as Vice Chair, acting chair from 1988–90.)
1988	James E. Burnett Jr. 1981–91	Patricia A. Goldman; 1979–88	Joseph T. Nall; 1986–89	John K. Lauber; 1985–95	James L. Kolstad; 1987–92
1988	James E. Burnett Jr. 1981–91	Lee V. Dickinson Jr. 1988–90	Joseph T. Nall; 1986–89	John K. Lauber; 1985–95	James L. Kolstad; 1987–92
1989	James E. Burnett Jr. 1981–91	Lee V. Dickinson Jr. 1988–90	Joseph T. Nall; 1986–89	John K. Lauber; 1985–95	James L. Kolstad; 1987–92
1989	James E. Burnett Jr. 1981–91	Lee V. Dickinson Jr. 1988–90	[vacant]	John K. Lauber; 1985–95	James L. Kolstad; 1987–92
1990	James E. Burnett Jr. 1981–91	Lee V. Dickinson Jr. 1988–90	[vacant]	John K. Lauber; 1985–95	James L. Kolstad; 1987–92
1990	James E. Burnett Jr. 1981–91	Susan M. Coughlin; 1990–94 (Note: Served as Vice Chair from 1990–94; also Acting Chair in 1994.)	Christopher A. Hart; 1990–93	John K. Lauber; 1985–95	James L. Kolstad; 1987–92
1991	James E. Burnett Jr. 1981–91	Susan M. Coughlin; 1990–94	Christopher A. Hart; 1990–93	John K. Lauber; 1985–95	James L. Kolstad; 1987–92
1991	John A. Hammerschmidt; 1991–2003	Susan M. Coughlin; 1990–94	Christopher A. Hart; 1990–93	John K. Lauber; 1985–95	James L. Kolstad; 1987–92
1992	John A. Hammerschmidt; 1991–2003	Susan M. Coughlin; 1990–94	Christopher A. Hart; 1990–93	John K. Lauber; 1985–95	James L. Kolstad; 1987–92
1992	John A. Hammerschmidt; 1991–2003	Susan M. Coughlin; 1990–94	Christopher A. Hart; 1990–93	John K. Lauber; 1985–95	Carl W. Vogt; 1992–94 (Note: Served as 7th Chair from 1992–94.)
1993	John A. Hammerschmidt; 1991–2003	Susan M. Coughlin; 1990–94	Christopher A. Hart; 1990–93	John K. Lauber; 1985–95	Carl W. Vogt; 1992–94
1993	John A. Hammerschmidt; 1991–2003	Susan M. Coughlin; 1990–94	James E. Hall; 1993–2001 (Note: Served as 8th Chair from 1994 to 2001.)	John K. Lauber; 1985–95	Carl W. Vogt; 1992–94
1994	John A. Hammerschmidt; 1991–2003	Susan M. Coughlin; 1990–94	James E. Hall; 1993–2001	John K. Lauber; 1985–95	Carl W. Vogt; 1992–94
1994	John A. Hammerschmidt; 1991–2003	[vacant]	James E. Hall; 1993–2001	John K. Lauber; 1985–95	[vacant]
1995	John A. Hammerschmidt; 1991–2003	[vacant]	James E. Hall; 1993–2001	John K. Lauber; 1985–95	[vacant]
1995	John A. Hammerschmidt; 1991–2003	Robert T. Francis II; 1995–99 (Note: Served as Vice Chair from 1995–99.)	James E. Hall; 1993–2001	John J. Goglia; 1995–2004	[vacant]
1996	John A. Hammerschmidt; 1991–2003	Robert T. Francis II; 1995–99	James E. Hall; 1993–2001	John J. Goglia; 1995–2004	[vacant]
1996	John A. Hammerschmidt; 1991–2003	Robert T. Francis II; 1995–99	James E. Hall; 1993–2001	John J. Goglia; 1995–2004	George W. Black Jr. 1996–2003
1997	John A. Hammerschmidt; 1991–2003	Robert T. Francis II; 1995–99	James E. Hall; 1993–2001	John J. Goglia; 1995–2004	George W. Black Jr. 1996–2003
1998	John A. Hammerschmidt; 1991–2003	Robert T. Francis II; 1995–99	James E. Hall; 1993–2001	John J. Goglia; 1995–2004	George W. Black Jr. 1996–2003
1999	John A. Hammerschmidt; 1991–2003	Robert T. Francis II; 1995–99	James E. Hall; 1993–2001	John J. Goglia; 1995–2004	George W. Black Jr. 1996–2003
1999	John A. Hammerschmidt; 1991–2003	[vacant]	James E. Hall; 1993–2001	John J. Goglia; 1995–2004	George W. Black Jr. 1996–2003
2000	John A. Hammerschmidt; 1991–2003	[vacant]	James E. Hall; 1993–2001	John J. Goglia; 1995–2004	George W. Black Jr. 1996–2003
2000	John A. Hammerschmidt; 1991–2003	Carol J. Carmody; 2000–05 (Note: Served as Vice Chair from 2001–03, including two stints as Acting Chair.)	James E. Hall; 1993–2001	John J. Goglia; 1995–2004	George W. Black Jr. 1996–2003
2001	John A. Hammerschmidt; 1991–2003	Carol J. Carmody; 2000–05	James E. Hall; 1993–2001	John J. Goglia; 1995–2004	George W. Black Jr. 1996–2003
2001	John A. Hammerschmidt; 1991–2003	Carol J. Carmody; 2000–05	Marion C. Blakey; 2001–02 (Note: Served as 9th Chair from 2001–02.)	John J. Goglia; 1995–2004	George W. Black Jr. 1996–2003
2002	John A. Hammerschmidt; 1991–2003	Carol J. Carmody; 2000–05	Marion C. Blakey; 2001–02	John J. Goglia; 1995–2004	George W. Black Jr. 1996–2003
2002	John A. Hammerschmidt; 1991–2003	Carol J. Carmody; 2000–05	[vacant]	John J. Goglia; 1995–2004	George W. Black Jr. 1996–2003
2003	John A. Hammerschmidt; 1991–2003	Carol J. Carmody; 2000–05	[vacant]	John J. Goglia; 1995–2004	George W. Black Jr. 1996–2003
2003	Ellen Engleman Conners; 2003–06 (Note: Served as 10th Chair from 2003–05.)	Carol J. Carmody; 2000–05	Mark V. Rosenker; 2003–09 (Note: Served as 11th Chair from 2006–08; also Acting Chair (as Vice Chair) in 2005–06 and 2008–09.)	John J. Goglia; 1995–2004	Richard F. Healing; 2003–05
2004	Ellen Engleman Conners; 2003–06	Carol J. Carmody; 2000–05	Mark V. Rosenker; 2003–09	John J. Goglia; 1995–2004	Richard F. Healing; 2003–05
2004	Ellen Engleman Conners; 2003–06	Carol J. Carmody; 2000–05	Mark V. Rosenker; 2003–09	Deborah A.P. Hersman; 2004–14 (Note: Served three terms as 12th Chair from 2009–14.)	Richard F. Healing; 2003–05
2005	Ellen Engleman Conners; 2003–06	Carol J. Carmody; 2000–05	Mark V. Rosenker; 2003–09	Deborah A.P. Hersman; 2004–14	Richard F. Healing; 2003–05
2005	Ellen Engleman Conners; 2003–06	[vacant]	Mark V. Rosenker; 2003–09	Deborah A.P. Hersman; 2004–14	[vacant]
2006	Ellen Engleman Conners; 2003–06	[vacant]	Mark V. Rosenker; 2003–09	Deborah A.P. Hersman; 2004–14	[vacant]
2006	Robert L. Sumwalt; 2006–21 (Note: Served as Vice Chair from 2006–08 and as 14th Chair 2017–2021.)	Kathryn O'Leary Higgins; 2006–09	Mark V. Rosenker; 2003–09	Deborah A.P. Hersman; 2004–14	[vacant]
2007	Robert L. Sumwalt; 2006–21	Kathryn O'Leary Higgins; 2006–09	Mark V. Rosenker; 2003–09	Deborah A.P. Hersman; 2004–14	[vacant]
2007	Robert L. Sumwalt; 2006–21	Kathryn O'Leary Higgins; 2006–09	Mark V. Rosenker; 2003–09	Deborah A.P. Hersman; 2004–14	Steven R. Chealander; 2007–09
2008	Robert L. Sumwalt; 2006–21	Kathryn O'Leary Higgins; 2006–09	Mark V. Rosenker; 2003–09	Deborah A.P. Hersman; 2004–14	Steven R. Chealander; 2007–09
2009	Robert L. Sumwalt; 2006–21	Kathryn O'Leary Higgins; 2006–09	Mark V. Rosenker; 2003–09	Deborah A.P. Hersman; 2004–14	Steven R. Chealander; 2007–09
2009	Robert L. Sumwalt; 2006–21	[vacant]	Christopher A. Hart; 2009–17 (Note: Served as Vice Chair from 2009-14, Acting Chair 2014, and as 13th Chair from 2015–17.)	Deborah A.P. Hersman; 2004–14	[vacant]
2010	Robert L. Sumwalt; 2006–21	[vacant]	Christopher A. Hart; 2009–17	Deborah A.P. Hersman; 2004–14	[vacant]
2010	Robert L. Sumwalt; 2006–21	Mark R. Rosekind; 2010–14	Christopher A. Hart; 2009–17	Deborah A.P. Hersman; 2004–14	Earl F. Weener; 2010–19
2011	Robert L. Sumwalt; 2006–21	Mark R. Rosekind; 2010–14	Christopher A. Hart; 2009–17	Deborah A.P. Hersman; 2004–14	Earl F. Weener; 2010–19
2012	Robert L. Sumwalt; 2006–21	Mark R. Rosekind; 2010–14	Christopher A. Hart; 2009–17	Deborah A.P. Hersman; 2004–14	Earl F. Weener; 2010–19
2013	Robert L. Sumwalt; 2006–21	Mark R. Rosekind; 2010–14	Christopher A. Hart; 2009–17	Deborah A.P. Hersman; 2004–14	Earl F. Weener; 2010–19
2014	Robert L. Sumwalt; 2006–21	Mark R. Rosekind; 2010–14	Christopher A. Hart; 2009–17	Deborah A.P. Hersman; 2004–14	Earl F. Weener; 2010–19
2014	Robert L. Sumwalt; 2006–21	[vacant]	Christopher A. Hart; 2009–17	[vacant]	Earl F. Weener; 2010–19
2015	Robert L. Sumwalt; 2006–21	[vacant]	Christopher A. Hart; 2009–17	[vacant]	Earl F. Weener; 2010–19
2015	Robert L. Sumwalt; 2006–21	[vacant]	Christopher A. Hart; 2009–17	T. Bella Dinh-Zarr; 2015–18 (Note: Served as Vice Chair from 2015–18.)	Earl F. Weener; 2010–19
2016	Robert L. Sumwalt; 2006–21	[vacant]	Christopher A. Hart; 2009–17	T. Bella Dinh-Zarr; 2015–18	Earl F. Weener; 2010–19
2017	Robert L. Sumwalt; 2006–21	[vacant]	Christopher A. Hart; 2009–17	T. Bella Dinh-Zarr; 2015–18	Earl F. Weener; 2010–19
2017	Robert L. Sumwalt; 2006–21	[vacant]	[vacant]	T. Bella Dinh-Zarr; 2015–18	Earl F. Weener; 2010–19
2018	Robert L. Sumwalt; 2006–21	[vacant]	[vacant]	T. Bella Dinh-Zarr; 2015–18	Earl F. Weener; 2010–19
2018	Robert L. Sumwalt; 2006–21	Bruce Landsberg; 2018–23 (Note: Served as Vice Chair 2018–23.)	Jennifer Homendy; 2018+ (Note: Served as Acting Chair from July 1, 2021 to August 13, 2021; served as 15th Chair from August 13.)	[vacant]	Earl F. Weener; 2010–19
2019	Robert L. Sumwalt; 2006–21	Bruce Landsberg; 2018–23	Jennifer Homendy; 2018+	[vacant]	Earl F. Weener; 2010–19
2019	Robert L. Sumwalt; 2006–21	Bruce Landsberg; 2018–23	Jennifer Homendy; 2018+	Michael Graham; 2020+ (Note: Served as Vice Chairman starting in 2026)	Thomas B. Chapman; 2020+
2020	Robert L. Sumwalt; 2006–21	Bruce Landsberg; 2018–23	Jennifer Homendy; 2018+	Michael Graham; 2020+	Thomas B. Chapman; 2020+
2021	[vacant]	Bruce Landsberg; 2018–23	Jennifer Homendy; 2018+	Michael Graham; 2020+	Thomas B. Chapman; 2020+
2022	[vacant]	Bruce Landsberg; 2018–23	Jennifer Homendy; 2018+	Michael Graham; 2020+	Thomas B. Chapman; 2020+
2023	[vacant]	Bruce Landsberg; 2018–23	Jennifer Homendy; 2018+	Michael Graham; 2020+	Thomas B. Chapman; 2020+
2024	Alvin Brown; 2024–25 (Note: Served as Vice Chair from December 2024 to May 2025 On May 5, 2025, was removed from board by the Trump administration more than a year before his term was set to expire.)	J. Todd Inman; 2024–2026	Jennifer Homendy; 2018+	Michael Graham; 2020+	Thomas B. Chapman; 2020+
2025	Alvin Brown; 2024–25	J. Todd Inman; 2024–2026	Jennifer Homendy; 2018+	Michael Graham; 2020+	Thomas B. Chapman; 2020+
2026	John DeLeeuw; 2026	J. Todd Inman; 2024–2026	Jennifer Homendy; 2018+		
2027	John DeLeeuw; 2026		Jennifer Homendy; 2018+		
2028			Jennifer Homendy; 2018+		
2029			Jennifer Homendy; 2018+		
