= James E. Hall =

American public servant

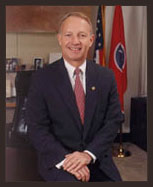

8th Chair of the National Transportation Safety Board
- In office 1994–2001
- President: Bill Clinton
- Preceded by: Carl Vogt
- Succeeded by: Marion Blakey

Personal details
- Born: December 21, 1941 (age 84)

James ("Jim") Evan Hall (born December 21, 1941) was nominated by President Bill Clinton to be a member of the National Transportation Safety Board where he served as its chairman from 1994 to 2001.

== Early life and education ==
Hall was born in Union City, Tennessee, the son of John Hall and Agnes Sanders Hall. He has ann older brother, John Richard Hall. He is the nephew of Rt. Rev. William Evan Sanders, the first Bishop of the Episcopal Diocese of East Tennessee, and Brice Sidney Sanders, the sixth bishop of the Episcopal Diocese of East Carolina.

After World War II, Hall’s family moved to Knoxville, Tennessee, where Hall attended public schools.

While attending Knoxville West High School, Hall served as the business manager for the high school newspaper, The West Wind, and was a commencement speaker at the 1959 graduation ceremony.

In 1960, Hall attended the University of Tennessee in Knoxville, where he served as president of the Sigma Chi fraternity. In 1962, Hall contributed to future Congressman Bob Clement’s successful campaign for student government as a freshman. While at the University of Tennessee, Hall assisted then-president Andrew (Andy) D. Holt’s efforts for racial integration at the school. In 1964, Hall served as chairman of the Tennessee Young Citizens for Johnson-Humphrey and as president of the College Young Democrats of Tennessee.

As a student at the University of Tennessee, Hall participated in the Army Reserve Officer Training Corps (ROTC), graduating with a Bachelor of Laws (LLB) and a commission in the United States Army in 1967.

== Career ==
Upon graduation from the University of Tennessee College of Law, Hall was commissioned as First lieutenant in the United States Army Signal Corps. From 1968 to 1969, he served in Vietnam and was awarded the Bronze Star for meritorious service in 1969. Hall was honorably discharged in 1970, having achieved the rank of Captain.

After ending active military duty, Hall joined United States Senator Albert Gore Sr.’s staff as special assistant and participated in Gore's 1970 reelection campaign. He then served as Border and Southern States coordinator during U.S. Senator Edmund Muskie’s campaign for the Democratic presidential nomination. Hall served as counsel to the United States Senate Subcommittee for Intergovernmental Relations created by Muskie in 1962.

Hall joined Franklin L. Haney Company, LLC in 1974 where he served as in-house counsel and managed Haney's 1974 campaign for governor of Tennessee. He assisted in the development and management of Haney's properties at the 1982 World's Fair, including the Holiday Inn and the Knoxville Convention Center.

In 1976, Hall joined the campaign for Democratic presidential nominee Jimmy Carter as a member of the advance staff for vice presidential nominee Walter Mondale. Hall managed Carter's 1980 presidential campaign in Tennessee.

Hall joined the law offices of Berger & Berger in Chattanooga, Tennessee, in 1974, handling cases in real estate and property law.

In 1986, Hall ran Tennessee House Speaker Ned McWherter’s successful primary election campaign for governor of Tennessee.

Hall joined Governor McWherter's cabinet as executive assistant of Policy and Planning and director of the State Planning Office, a position Hall held from 1987 to 1991. Hall managed McWherter's successful 1990 campaign for reelection.

In 1991, the University of Chattanooga Foundation reports, Hall "received a phone call from an old friend, Bill Clinton. Hall had known Clinton since the late 1960s due to their involvement with the College Young Democrats." Clinton asked Hall to run his presidential campaign in Tennessee. Hall agreed and took a leave of absence from the State Planning Office to run the campaign. Hall and his wife Annie served as delegates to the 1992 Democratic National Convention in New York City.

Upon Clinton's election in 1992, U.S. Senator Al Gore, Jr. resigned to serve as Vice President of the United States and Harlan Mathews was appointed to complete Senator Gore's term representing Tennessee in the U.S. Senate. Hall took a temporary leave of absence from the Tennessee State Planning Office to serve as Matthews's Chief of staff in 1993, acknowledging that his departure from state government might be permanent if he was offered a position in Clinton's administration. That offer came in February 1993, when he was nominated by President Bill Clinton to serve as a member and later as chairman of the National Transportation Safety Board (NTSB), appointments that were later confirmed by the U.S. Senate. Hall served for over seven years, notifying President Clinton of his intent to resign in January 2001. Upon leaving NTSB, among other accolades, Hall was awarded an honorary degree, Doctor of Public Service, by George Washington University.

After his tenure at the NTSB, Hall founded a consulting firm, Hall & Associates, LLC, in 2001. Since then, he has continued his interest in transportation safety, appearing as a guest speaker on transportation safety and security issues on MSNBC, NBC’s Today show, CBS, ABC, NPR, and other national and international news networks. In 2014, Hall appeared on several networks to provide insights and commentary on Malaysia Airlines Flight 17, which was shot down in eastern Ukraine by Russian forces and accidents involving the redesigned Boeing 737 MAX.

Hall is a former member of the Board of Trustees at the University of Tennessee having been appointed by Governor Phil Bredesen. He also served on the Board of the University of Chattanooga Foundation. He served as Chairman of the Enterprise Center in Chattanooga for eight years, a board member of U.S. Xpress Enterprises, a member of the External Advisory Board of BP America PLC, and on the National Academy of Engineering’s Committee on Combating Terrorism and the Aviation Institute Advisory Board at George Washington University.

He currently serves as chair of the Chattanooga Metropolitan Airport Authority. He is also a member of the national board of the Center for Alcohol Policy.

== Tennessee State Planning Office ==
While serving as the Director of the State Planning Office under Governor Ned McWherter, Hall oversaw several of McWherter's major initiatives including the Solid Waste Management Act (1991), the Tennessee SportsFest, the Governor’s Alliance for a Drug-Free Tennessee. The Drug-Free Tennessee program involved a statewide media campaign to educate the public on the harmful effects of drugs and alcohol, and enlist Tennessee citizens’ help in stopping the drug epidemic across the state. As chairman of the Governor’s Council on Physical Fitness and Health, Hall oversaw the decision to bring the 1994 Tennessee Sportsfest—a statewide, Olympic-style competition open to all Tennesseeans—to his hometown of Chattanooga, Tennessee.

Governor McWherter delegated to Hall and the State Planning Office the responsibility of planning Tennessee’s 1996 Bicentennial Celebration. An integral part of that celebration was the idea proposed to McWherter by Hall and his office for the creation of the Bicentennial Capitol Mall State Park in Nashville. Another major initiative delegated to Hall and the State Planning Office was Tennessee’s participation in the 1996 Summer Olympics in Atlanta. As a result of Planning Office recommendation and Governor McWherter’s leadership, the Ocoee River in Tennessee was selected as the site for the whitewater Olympic competition, the only event of the 1996 Olympics held outside the State of Georgia.

== National Transportation Safety Board ==
As chair of the NTSB, Hall worked tirelessly to improve safety in all modes of transportation in the United States and abroad. He visited more than 30 countries and oversaw a period of unprecedented activity as the NTSB investigated numerous aviation, rail, pipeline, and maritime accidents in the United States. Among the most high-profile and sensitive investigations led by Hall were USAir Flight 427 and American Eagle Flight 4184 in 1994; the 1995 Fox River Grove bus–train collision; the Birgenair Flight 301, ValuJet Flight 592, and TWA Flight 800 in 1996; John Denver’s fatal crash in 1997; the Carnival Ecstasy fire in 1998; the AMTRAK crash in Bourbonnais, Illinois, the Olympic pipeline explosion in Bellingham, Washington, and the EgyptAir Flight 990 in 1999; and the Alaska Airlines Flight 261 in 2000. In 1996, President Clinton named Hall to the White House Commission on Aviation Safety and Security. In 1999, Hall appeared on an episode of 60 Minutes titled "The Search for John F. Kennedy, Jr."

Throughout his tenure at NTSB, Hall worked behind the scenes to urge airlines to install fire detection and suppression systems and upgrade equipment to prevent future accidents. He brought the NTSB into a new era of supporting not only victims of transportation accidents, but also their families, and doggedly advocated for better protections for children across all modes of transportation.

Under Hall’s leadership the NTSB issued landmark safety studies on commuter airlines, the air tourism industry, the performance and use of child restraint systems, personal watercraft, transit bus operations, passive-grade railway crossings, and the dangers posed to children by passenger-side airbags in automobiles.

== Awards ==
In 1999 Hall received the Greater New York Automobile Dealers’ Association World Traffic Safety Award for his outstanding leadership in promoting transportation safety initiatives, including putting child passenger protection first in automotive design and regulation. In May, 2002, Hall was awarded an honorary degree in public service from George Washington University for outstanding leadership and commitment to the public during his time at the National Transportation Safety Board.

== Family life ==
In 1973, Hall married Anne Stewart (“Annie”) Impink of Shillington, Pennsylvania. The couple met in 1971 in Washington, DC, while working in Senator Edmund Muskie's presidential campaign. The Halls have one child, Mary ("Molly") Elizabeth Cooper.
