= Jennifer Homendy =

American government official (born 1971)

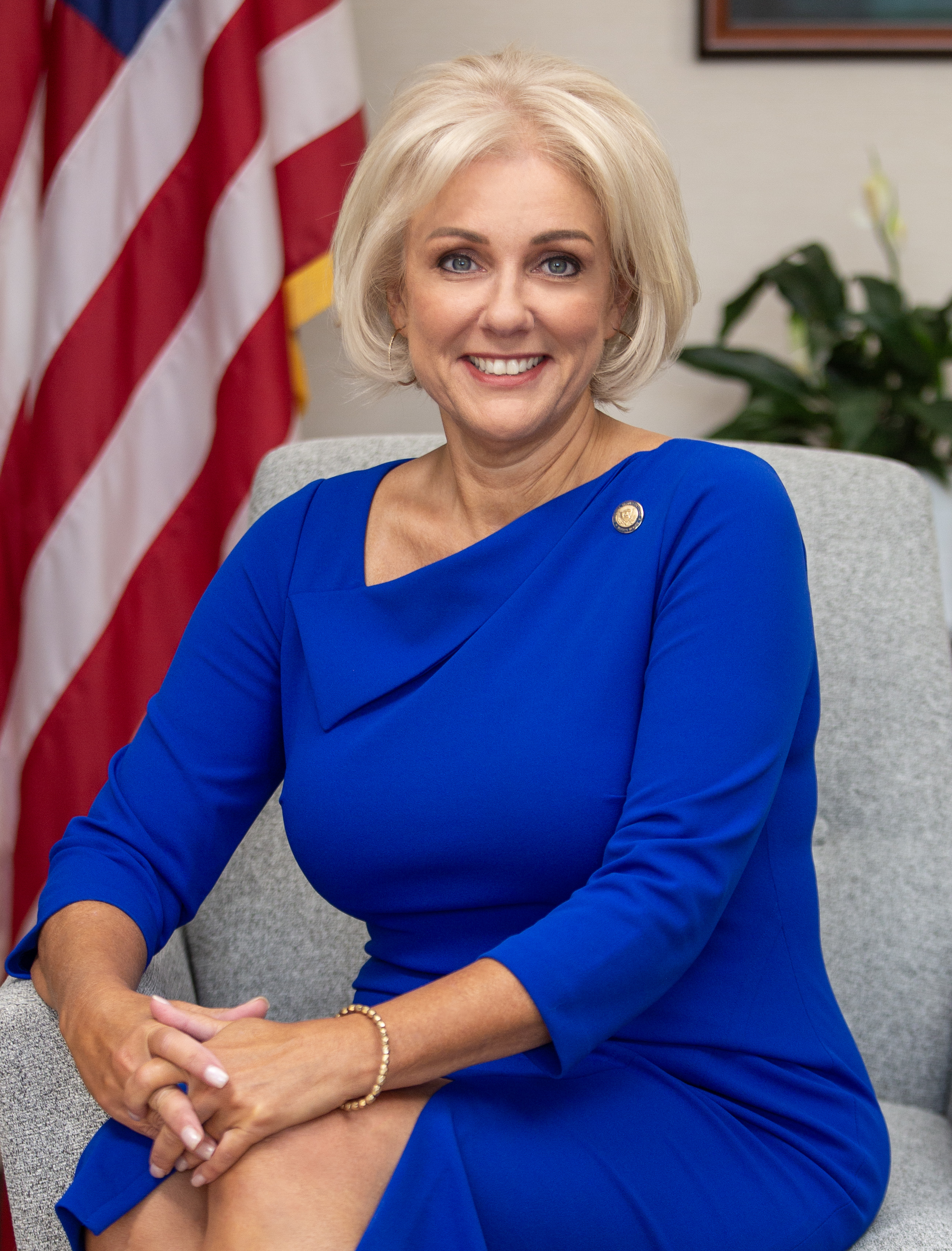
- Homendy in 2024

15th Chair of the National Transportation Safety Board
- Incumbent
- Assumed office August 13, 2021
- President: Joe Biden; Donald Trump
- Preceded by: Robert Sumwalt

44th Member of the National Transportation Safety Board
- Incumbent
- Assumed office August 20, 2018
- President: Donald Trump; Joe Biden; Donald Trump
- Preceded by: Mark Rosekind

Personal details
- Born: Jennifer Lynn Esposito; November 26, 1971 (age 54) New Britain, Connecticut, U.S.
- Spouse: Michael Homendy
- Children: 1
- Education: Pennsylvania State University (BA); Clemson University (MTSA)

Jennifer Lynn Homendy (née Esposito; born November 26, 1971) is an American government official, serving as the 15th chair of the National Transportation Safety Board (NTSB) since August 2021, having been a member of the NTSB since August 2018. Homendy worked in legislative advocacy for the AFL-CIO and the International Brotherhood of Teamsters before being appointed to the NTSB by President Donald Trump. As NTSB Chair, she has overseen responses to transportation incidents including the 2023 East Palestine, Ohio, train derailment; the 2024 Francis Scott Key Bridge collapse; the 2025 Potomac River mid-air collision; Air Canada Express Flight 8646; and 21 Air Flight 7598, and has made recommendations for improving transportation safety by air, road, rail, and sea.

== Early life and education ==
Homendy was born Jennifer Lynn Esposito in New Britain, Connecticut, on November 26, 1971, and grew up in Plainville, Connecticut.

In 1994, Homendy gained a BA from Capital College of Pennsylvania State University. She received an online Master of Transportation Safety Administration degree from Clemson University in South Carolina.

== Career ==
From 1994 to 1996, Homendy worked for the National Federation of Independent Business. In 1996 and 1997, Homendy worked as a government relations manager at the American Iron and Steel Institute.

From 1997 to 1999, she was a legislative representative for the Transportation Trades Department, AFL-CIO, specializing in motor carrier, rail, hazardous material, and nuclear waste transportation safety. From 1999 to 2004, she was a legislative representative for the International Brotherhood of Teamsters, representing the union on advisory committees to the Office of the United States Trade Representative, including the Advisory Committee on Trade Policy and Negotiations and the Labor Advisory Committee for Trade Negotiations and Trade Policy.

From 2004 to 2018, Homendy was a staff member for the United States House Transportation Subcommittee on Railroads, Pipelines, and Hazardous Materials.

In 2018, she was appointed as the 44th member of the National Transportation Safety Board.

=== National Transportation Safety Board ===
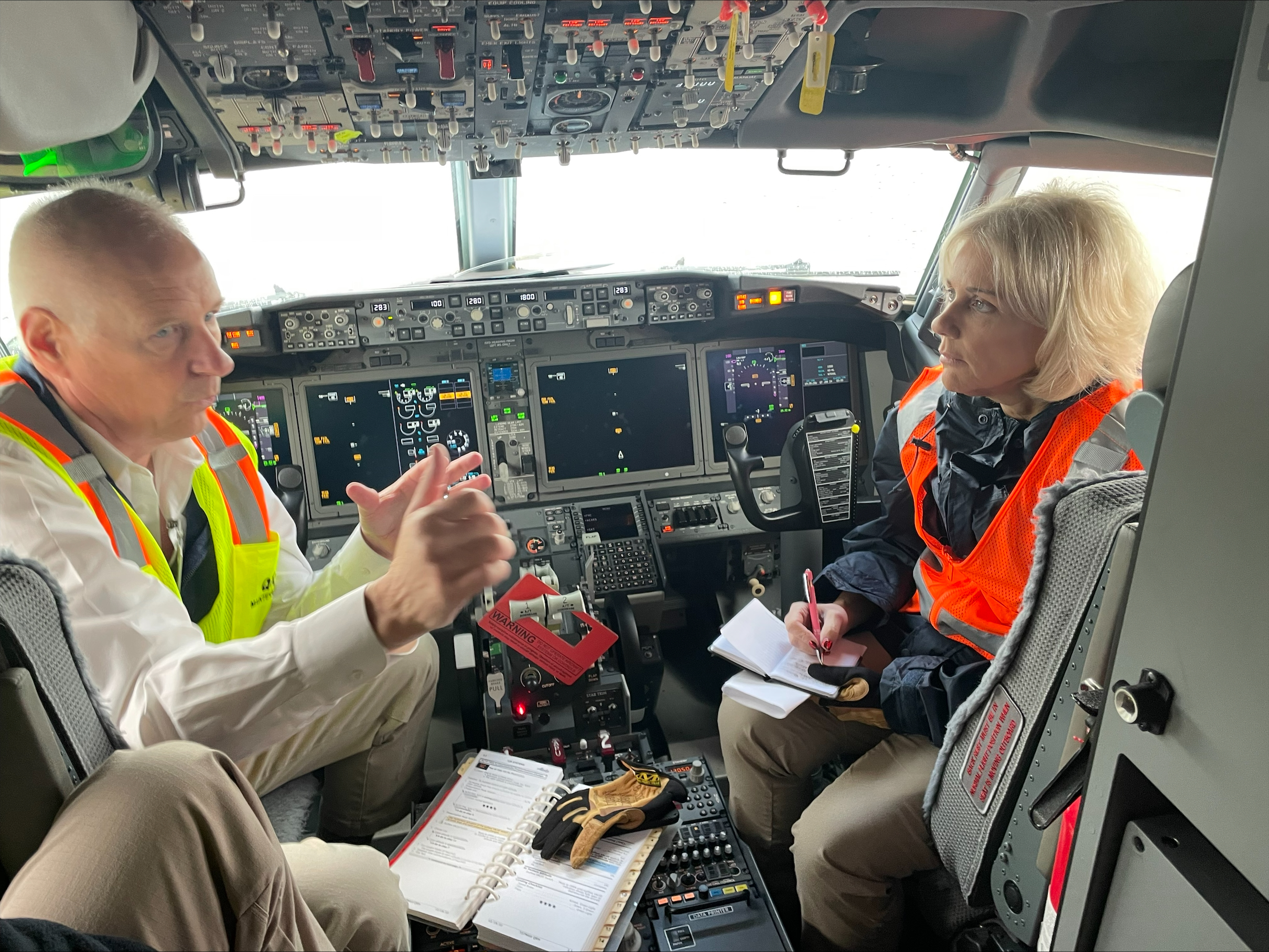
Homendy (right) sits in the cockpit of the 737 MAX 9 aircraft involved in the Alaska Airlines Flight 1282 accident.

Homendy has been a member of the National Transportation Safety Board (NTSB) since 2018 and has been the chair of the NTSB since 2021. The United States Senate unanimously confirmed Homendy for another five-year term on May 14, 2024.

==== Nominations and confirmations ====
===== Trump administration =====
On April 11, 2018, President Donald Trump nominated Homendy to be a member of the NTSB and finish out a term expiring in 2019. The Senate Commerce Committee held hearings on Homendy's nomination on May 16, 2018. The committee favorably reported her nomination to the Senate floor on May 22, 2018. Homendy was confirmed by the entire Senate on July 24, 2018, via voice vote.

Homendy was renominated to the board to serve a full five-year term by President Trump on December 14, 2018. The Commerce Committee held hearings on her nomination on July 24, 2019. The full Senate confirmed her to a full term by voice vote on August 9, 2019.

=== Biden administration ===
On May 19, 2021, President Joe Biden nominated Homendy to serve as the chair of the NTSB. On June 24, 2021, the Senate Commerce Committee held hearings on the nomination. The committee favorably reported Homendy's nomination on August 4, 2021. The entire Senate confirmed her by voice vote on August 9, 2021.

Homendy was renominated by Biden to a second five-year term on the NTSB, and another three-year term as chair, in 2024. She was confirmed by the Senate on May 14, 2024.

=== NTSB oversight work ===
During Homendy's tenure, the NTSB expanded its investigative capacity, hiring 71 new staff members in 2023, bringing its workforce to 430 employees. Homendy has overseen investigations of a number of prominent incidents, and has championed NTSB efforts with respect to a number of transportation safety issues. At the same time, the NTSB backlog of 500 cases was brought down to zero.

==== Air travel ====
Homendy has overseen a number of high-profile transportation incident investigations. In October 2019, she headed the "go team" sent in response to the 2019 Boeing B-17 Flying Fortress crash at Bradley International Airport, Windsor Locks, Connecticut. In 2020, she briefed the media on the investigation of the 2020 Calabasas helicopter crash, in which basketball star Kobe Bryant was one of the nine people killed.

She oversaw the 2024 investigation of Alaska Airlines Flight 1282, in which an Alaska Airlines Boeing 737 MAX 9 experienced uncontrolled decompression when a door plug detached during flight. Following the incident, she criticized Boeing for its initial failure to disclose the names of 25 workers involved in the door installation.

Following the 2025 Potomac River mid-air collision, Homendy expressed anger that the FAA had not used the same near-miss data her investigators relied on to identify the risk and examine the helicopter routes before the crash occurred, stating, "It does make me angry, but it also makes me feel incredibly devastated for families that are grieving." Weeks after the Potomac crash, Homendy travelled to Anchorage, Alaska, to investigate the crash of Bering Air Flight 445. In April 2025, she traveled to Jersey City, New Jersey, to lead the investigation in the wake of the 2025 Hudson River helicopter crash.

Homendy has advocated for broader aviation safety reforms, having urged the Federal Aviation Administration (FAA) to require retrofitting all aircraft with cockpit voice recorders capable of storing 25 hours of data, an increase from the current two-hour recording loop. Additionally, she has called for stricter oversight of near-miss aviation incidents.

==== Trains ====
Homendy has sought stronger rail safety regulations, particularly following the East Palestine, Ohio, train derailment on February 3, 2023. The following year, Homendy testified before the US Senate Committee on Commerce, Science and Transportation (SCCST) that the controlled release and burn of vinyl chloride following the accident in East Palestine was not necessary. Homendy stated that the decision-makers relied on contractors who were alarmed by the limited temperature readings they were able to get, combined with the violent way one of the tank cars released vinyl chloride with a roar from a pressure release valve after hours of calm. However, Homendy also stated that OxyVinyls, the company that manufactured and was shipping the volatile chemicals, did not believe polymerization was occurring. Both Ohio senators reacted to Homendy's announcement. JD Vance wondered why the unnecessary burnoff was rushed and suggested Norfolk Southern wanted to open the rail line and move freight again. Sherrod Brown said the burnoff provided proof that Norfolk Southern considered profit more than safety.

Prior to the East Palestine train derailment, Homendy had investigated the 2022 Missouri train derailment, in which an Amtrak passenger train struck a dump truck that was obstructing the crossing of County Road 113, about three miles (4.8 km) southwest of Mendon, Missouri, killing the truck driver and three train passengers, with scores more injured.

==== Surface roads and bridges ====
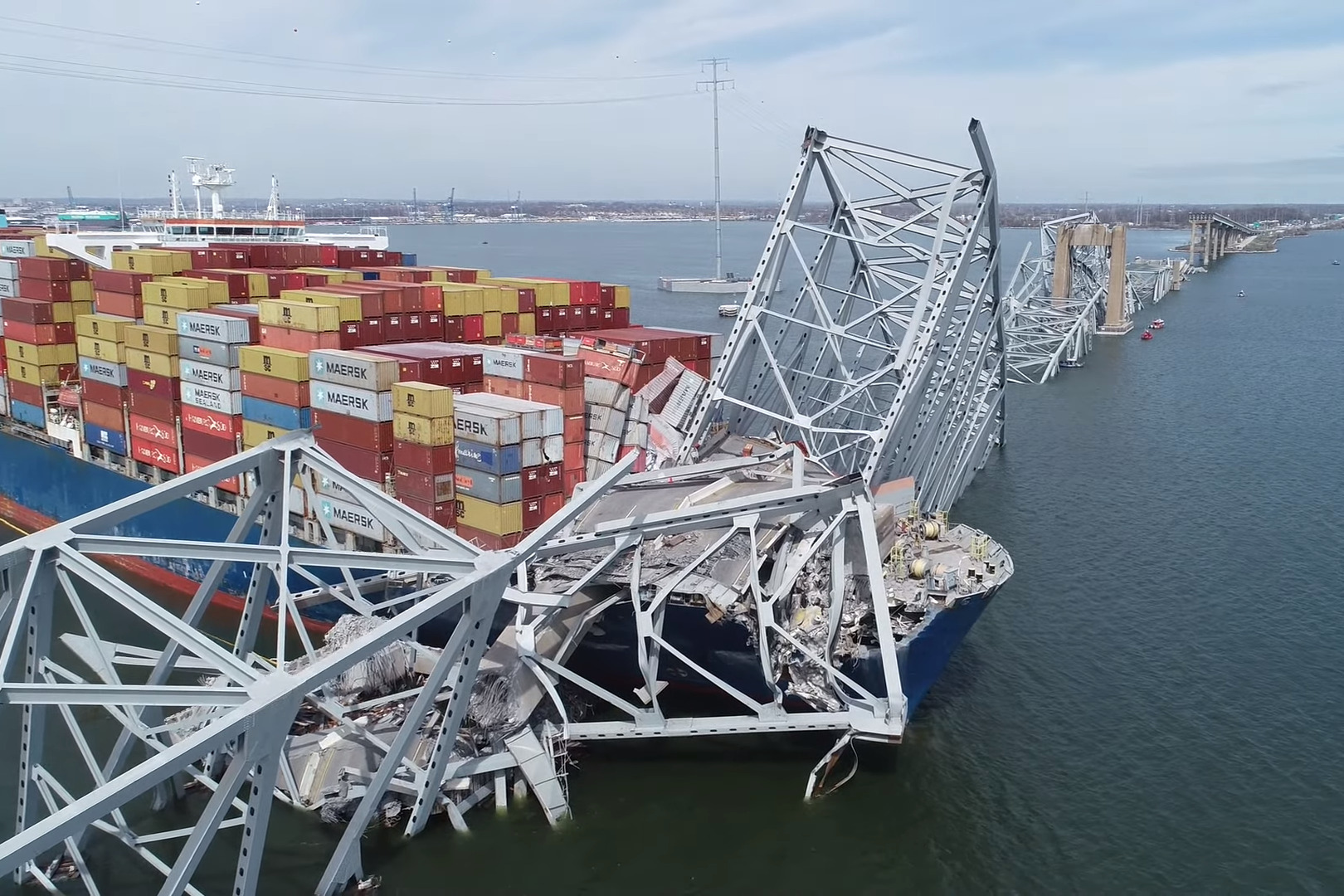
Aftermath of the Francis Scott Key Bridge collapse, investigated by Homendy

In January 2022, Homendy led the NTSB investigation of the collapse of the Fern Hollow Bridge in Pittsburgh, Pennsylvania. She was the on-scene board member for the Francis Scott Key Bridge collapse in Baltimore in March 2024.

She has criticized the National Highway Traffic Safety Administration (NHTSA) for attributing most road deaths to human error, arguing that many fatalities could instead be prevented through improvements in road design and auto safety features. She made these remarks in the context of data showing that U.S. road deaths in 2021, measured per one million inhabitants, exceeded those of all other OECD countries. NHTSA removed the 94% human error statistic from its website just days after Homendy's statement to the media.

Homendy has been critical of Tesla, Inc.'s so-called Full Self-Driving feature. She called the term full self-driving "misleading and irresponsible", and urged Tesla to address safety issues identified by the NTSB before expanding Full Self-Driving features that operate on city streets. In response to a question regarding Homendy's comments, Tesla CEO Elon Musk tweeted a link to Homendy's Wikipedia article, leading to a "number of attacks" on the content.

In 2023, Homendy highlighted the risks of electric vehicles such as the Ford F-150 Lightning, GMC Hummer EV, and the battery-electric version of the Volvo XC40, as being significantly heavier than internal-combustion-engine vehicles, increasing the risk of other road users being killed or seriously injured in collisions.

==== Ships ====
In 2019, Homendy investigated the sinking of MV Conception, a dive boat that caught fire and eventually sank off the coast of Santa Cruz Island, California, killing 34 of the 39 aboard, including all 33 passengers and one of the six crew members. During a tour of the sister ship MV Vision, Homendy was "taken aback" by the difficulty of using the aft escape hatch. "You have to climb up a ladder and across the top bunk and then push a wooden door up. It was a tight space." Speaking on September 3, 2019, Member Homendy said she was "one hundred percent confident that we will learn the why and the how" behind the accident.

Although the NTSB was not able to determine the definitive cause of the fire, Homendy argued that the focus should be on conditions "that allowed the fire to go undetected and to grow to a point where it prevented the evacuation", further stating, "I hate the term accident in this case because, in my opinion, it is not an accident if you fail to operate your company safely". In December 2021, the United States Coast Guard issued interim rules implementing many of the safety recommendations from the NTSB's investigation report, and a 2023 letter sent by Homendy to the Coast Guard Commandant reiterated the need for a safety management system requirement. Homendy also reiterated the NTSB's call for action on the fifth anniversary of the Conception disaster, stating, "How many families have to stand up here at a press conference, grieving their loved ones, before action is taken?"

Political offices
Preceded by Robert Sumwalt	Chair of the National Transportation Safety Board; 2021–present	Incumbent
