= Zumwalt =

Zumwalt may refer to:

== People ==
- Zumwalt (surname)

== Places ==
- Fort Zumwalt Park, a historic site in Saint Charles County, Missouri
- Fort Zumwalt School District, named after a historic homestead fort in the park
  - Fort Zumwalt East High School (2007 in St. Peters, Missouri)
  - Fort Zumwalt North High School (O'Fallon, Missouri; established 1960, moved 1976)
  - Fort Zumwalt South High School (1987 in St. Peters)
  - Fort Zumwalt West High School (1998 in O'Fallon)
- Zumwalt Prairie, Oregon

== Ships ==
- USS Zumwalt (DDG-1000)
- Zumwalt-class destroyer

== See also ==
- Sumwalt
