= Deborah Hersman =

Government official (born 1970)

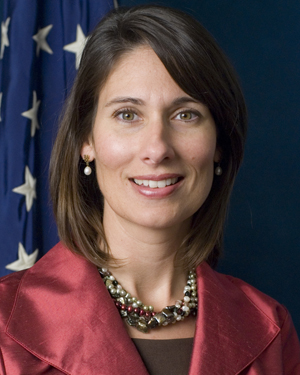

12th Chair of the National Transportation Safety Board
- In office July 28, 2009 – April 25, 2014
- President: Barack Obama
- Preceded by: Mark Rosenker
- Succeeded by: Christopher A. Hart

Member of the National Transportation Safety Board
- In office June 21, 2004 – April 25, 2014
- President: George W. Bush; Barack Obama
- Preceded by: John Goglia
- Succeeded by: Tho Bella Dinh-Zarr

Personal details
- Born: May 7, 1970 (age 56) Edwards Air Force Base, California, U.S.
- Party: Democratic
- Education: Virginia Tech (B.A.); George Mason University (M.S.)

Deborah A.P. Hersman (born May 7, 1970) is a former board member of the U.S. National Transportation Safety Board who served as its 12th chairman. She completed two terms as chairman and was confirmed by the U.S. Senate on October 16, 2013, for a third term. On March 11, 2014, she announced she would join the National Safety Council as its president and CEO. She is the former chief safety officer at Waymo.

== Personal life ==
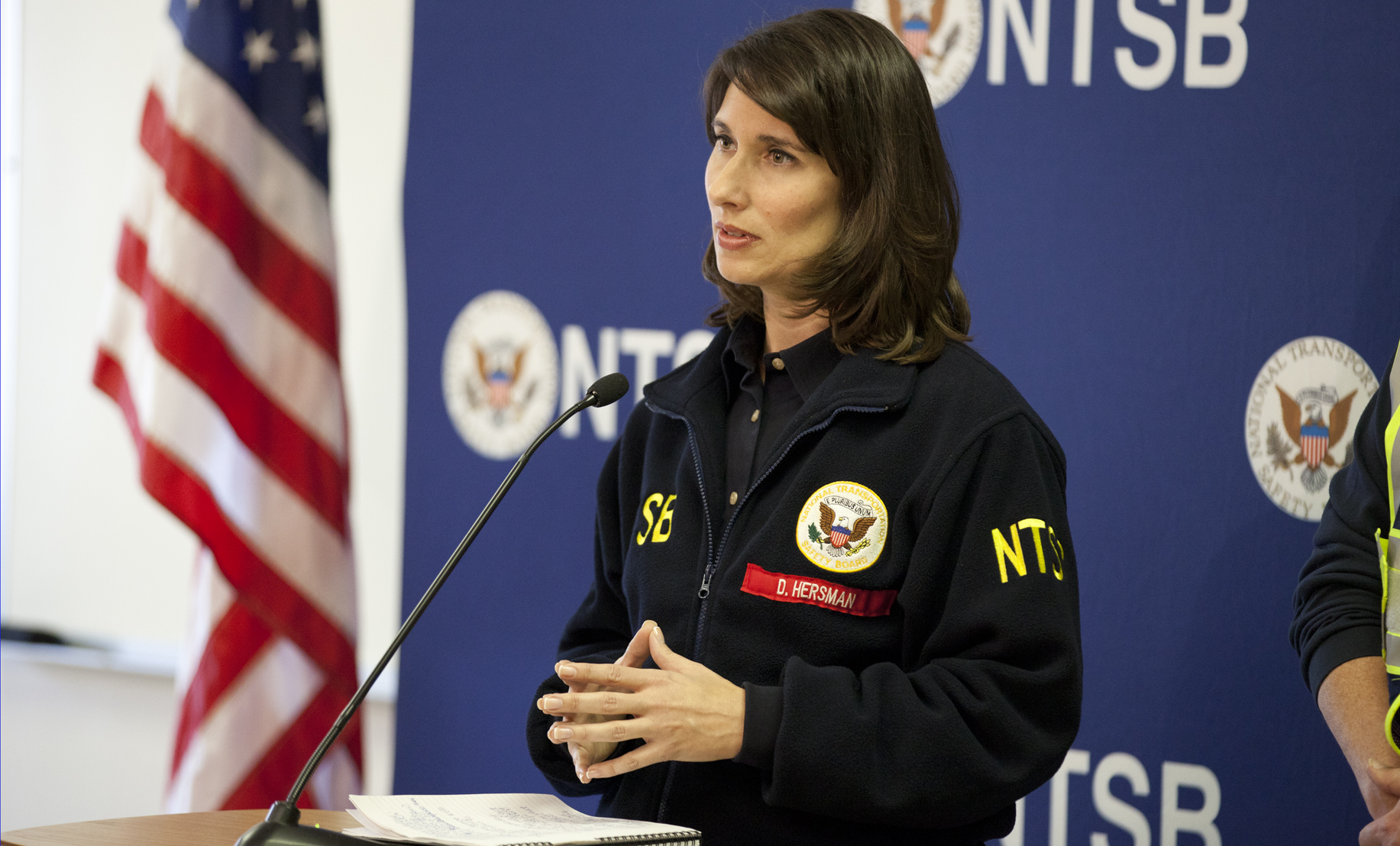
Hersman briefing the press as chair of the NTSB in 2012

She is the eldest daughter of retired Air Force Brig. Gen. Walter C Hersman, who served as a fighter pilot and test pilot. She has two sisters. She was born in California and lived with her family in places such as Amman, Jordan, Madrid, Spain, as well as Woodbridge, England and numerous states. She attended 4 different high schools. By the time she turned 17, the Hersmans had settled in Northern Virginia where she attended Chantilly High School. She was a student pilot and soloed but did not complete her training. She earned a commercial driver license (with passenger, school bus, and air brake endorsements) and has a motorcycle endorsement.

In 1992, she earned Bachelor of Arts degrees in Political Science and International Studies from Virginia Tech. In 2000, she earned an M.S. in Conflict Analysis and Resolution from George Mason University. Hersman is married to her high school sweetheart and former Virginia Tech classmate, Niel Plummer. They have three sons.

== Career ==
Hersman began her government career on the staff of West Virginia Congressman Bob Wise as an unpaid intern during the summer of her sophomore year at Virginia Tech. She rose from intern to office manager and then to senior legislative aide. While working for Wise, Hersman dealt with a series of coal train derailments near Point Pleasant, West Virginia. Wise said, "She has a backbone. Don't ever think that you are ever going to push her over."

In 1999, she left Wise's office to join the staff of the United States Senate Committee on Commerce, Science, and Transportation. Her efforts contributed to the passage of milestone bills such as the Motor Carrier Safety Improvement Act of 1999, Pipeline Safety Improvement Act of 2002, Transportation Equity Act of the 21st Century and Amtrak Reform and Accountability Act.

In 2004, Hersman was appointed as the 35th member of the National Transportation Safety Board (NTSB) by President George W. Bush and was sworn in on June 21. In 2009, President Barack Obama reappointed her to a second five-year term and appointed her to a two-year term as chairman, making her, at age 39, one of the youngest to ever to fill that position. President Obama reappointed Hersman as chairman in 2011, and in August 2013, he nominated her for a third term as chairman and a third term as a board member. Pending Senate confirmation, the President designated Hersman to serve as vice chairman, making her acting chairman of the NTSB. Her nomination was confirmed by voice vote on October 16, 2013.

As a board member, Hersman traveled with NTSB teams investigating major accidents ranging from the collision of two Washington Metro trains to the mid-air collision of a sightseeing helicopter and single-engine airplane over the Hudson River in New York City. She investigated over 25 major transportation incidents during her tenure at the NTSB. As chairman, Hersman focused on distracted driving, child passenger safety and helping victims and their families.

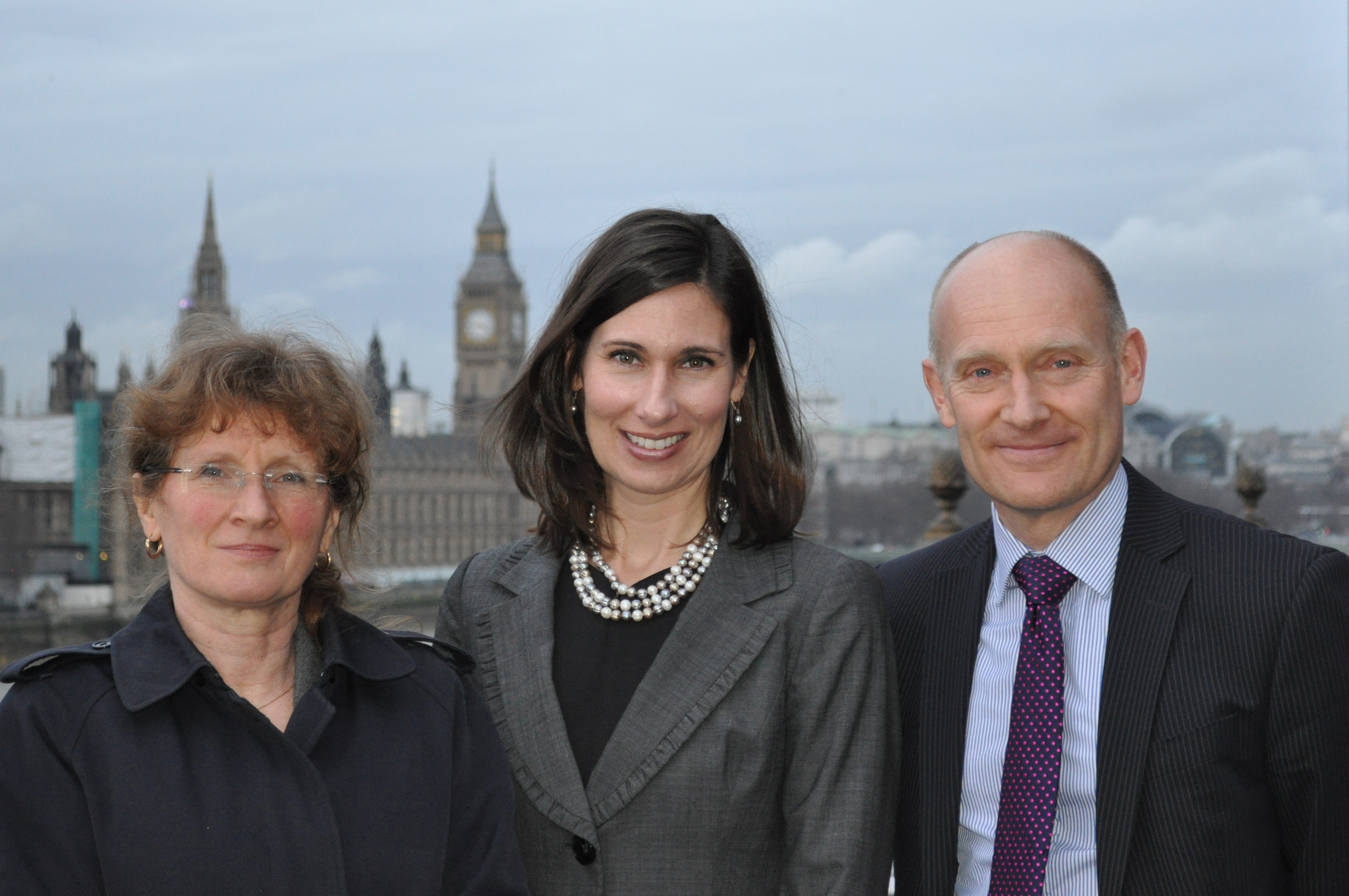
Hersman with British safety officials Carolyn Griffiths and Keith Conradi in London, 2014

In 2014 Hersman resigned from the NTSB to become president and CEO of the nonprofit National Safety Council, based in Itasca, Illinois. She was awarded the 2015 Sentinel of Safety Award by the National Air Traffic Controllers Association for her dedication to transportation and aviation safety. She was recognized by NHTSA Public Service Award in 2016. In 2017, Hersman was appointed by Transportation Secretary Anthony Foxx to serve on the Department of Transportation Advisory Committee on Automation in Transportation. The advisory panel was established to provide counsel regarding technology implementation that can save lives and help eliminate preventable fatalities in all modes of transportation. Hersman chaired the Road to Zero Coalition led by the National Safety Council, The U.S. Department of Transportation's National Highway Traffic Safety Administration, Federal Highway Administration and Federal Motor Carrier Safety Administration. The Coalition aims to end roadway fatalities within 30 years by a strategy that combines education, engineering, enforcement and emergency medical services. She stepped down when she left the National Safety Council in January 2019 to lead the safety team at Waymo.

Political offices
Preceded by Mark Rosenker	Chair of the National Transportation Safety Board; 2009–2014	Succeeded by Christopher A. Hart
