= Francis H. McAdams =

American civil servant

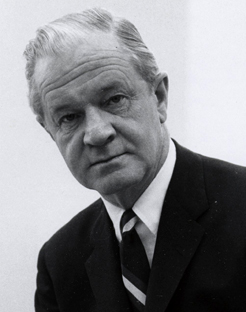

Member of the National Transportation Safety Board
- In office 1967–1983
- President: Lyndon Johnson; Richard Nixon; Gerald Ford; Jimmy Carter; Ronald Reagan

Personal details
- Born: December 27, 1915 Brooklyn, New York City, New York, U.S.
- Died: December 11, 1985 (aged 69) Washington, U.S.
- Spouse: Katherine Egan
- Children: 4
- Education: Georgetown University Law School

Francis H. McAdams, Jr. (December 27, 1915 – December 11, 1985) was born in Brooklyn, New York. He was a longtime member of the United States National Transportation Safety Board (NTSB). He joined the board on July 31, 1967, having been nominated a few months earlier by President Lyndon Johnson, and was confirmed by the United States Senate on April 20, 1978.

McAdams was a naval aviator of World War II from 1942 to 1946. He obtained his A.B., LL.B., and LL.M. law degree from Georgetown University Law School. From 1946 to 1948, McAdams was a corporate and trial attorney for Capital Airlines, and from 1948 to 1951, he was an attorney-trial examiner and air safety investigator for the Civil Aeronautics Board. From 1951 to 1954, he was senior trial attorney for the Civil Aeronautics Board. From 1954 to 1958, McAdams practiced law in Chicago. From 1958 to 1967 he was an assistant to a member of the Civil Aeronautics Board.

He was reappointed to the board at least three times, and stayed on for 16 years, becoming the longest-serving member in the history of the NTSB.

McAdams published "Professional immunity and incident reporting" through the Department of Transportation, National Transportation Safety Board in 1977.

He died December 11, 1985, while jogging.

== See also ==
Four NTSB accident reports in which McAdams gave a dissenting opinion:

- TWA Flight 159
- Southern Airways Flight 242
- Pacific Southwest Airlines Flight 182 (The gist of his dissent was adopted as official findings three years later.)
- Transamerica Airlines Flight 18 (https://www.ntsb.gov/investigations/AccidentReports/Reports/AAR8011.pdf)
