= Zumwalt (surname) =

Zumwalt is a North American surname. Notable people with the surname include:

- Alec Zumwalt (born 1981), American baseball coach
- Elmo Zumwalt (1920–2000), U.S. Navy admiral and Zumwalt-class destroyer namesake
- James P. Zumwalt (born 1956), U.S. Deputy Assistant Secretary of State for East Asia
- Jason Zumwalt (born 1975), American actor, voice actor, comedian and scriptwriter
- Rick Zumwalt (1951–2003), American actor and arm-wrestler
- Rick Zumwalt (American football) (born 1965), American football player
- Rosemary Lévy Zumwalt (born 1944), American folklorist, anthropologist, and historian

== See also ==
- Zumwalt (disambiguation)
