= Christopher A. Hart =

American lawyer, government official, and pilot

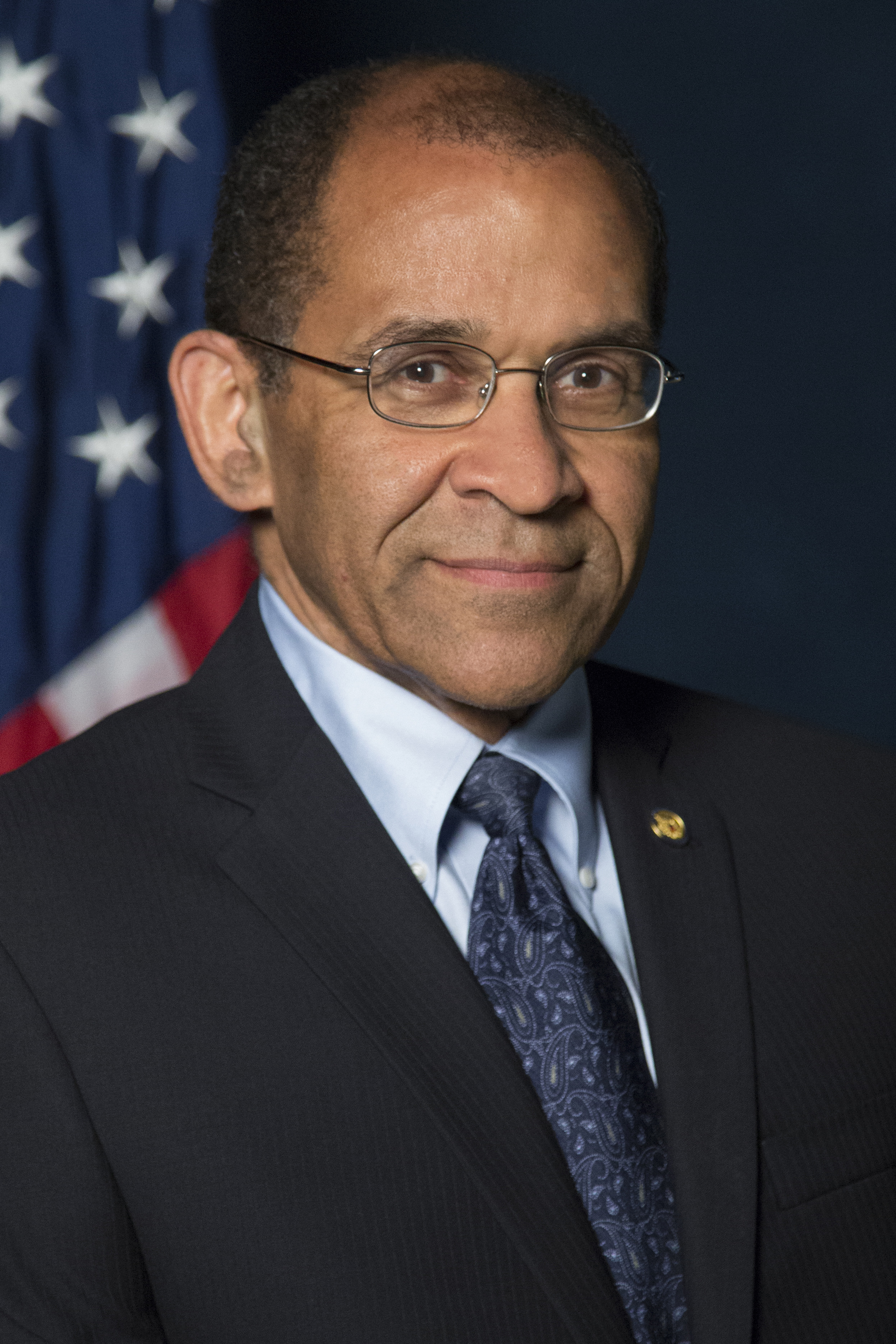

13th Chair of the National Transportation Safety Board
- In office April 26, 2014 – August 9, 2017
- President: Barack Obama; Donald Trump
- Preceded by: Deborah Hersman
- Succeeded by: Robert Sumwalt

Personal details
- Education: Princeton University (B.S., M.S.); Harvard University (J.D.)

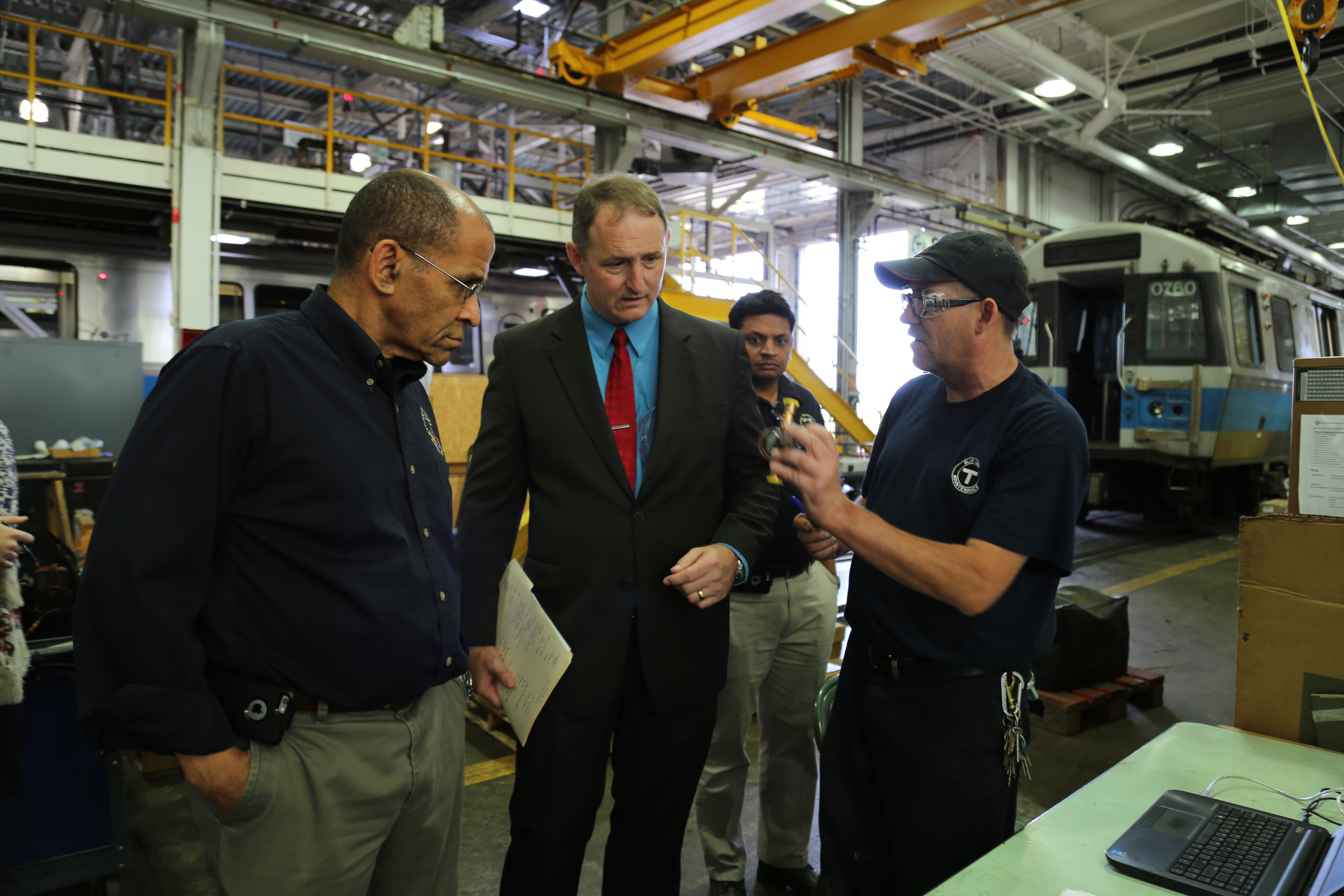
Hart (left) tours MBTA facilities in 2017

Christopher A. Hart is an American lawyer, government official, and pilot. He served as the 13th chairman of the National Transportation Safety Board. He served as Acting NTSB Chairman beginning April 26, 2014, and in June 2014 was nominated by President Barack Obama to serve as Chairman of the NTSB. He was confirmed to serve as chairman on February 5, 2015. Robert Sumwalt succeeded him as chairman in August 2017.

== Personal life ==
Hart's great uncle, James Banning, was the first African-American to receive a pilot's license issued by the U.S. government in 1926.

Hart is a licensed pilot with commercial, multi-engine, and instrument ratings.

== Education ==
Hart holds a B.S. and an M.S. in Aeronautical Engineering from Princeton University and a J.D. from Harvard Law School.

== Career ==
From 1973 until joining the NTSB in 1990, Hart held a series of legal positions, mostly in the private sector. He is a member of the District of Columbia Bar and the Lawyer-Pilots Bar Association.

He first served as a member of the NTSB from 1990 to 1993. After leaving the board, he served as deputy administrator of the National Highway Traffic Safety Administration, before moving to the Federal Aviation Administration (FAA) in 1995.

Immediately before returning to the board in 2009, Hart was deputy director for air traffic safety oversight at the FAA. He had been the FAA assistant administrator for system safety.

Hart was sworn in as a member of the National Transportation Safety Board on August 12, 2009, and designated by President Obama for a two-year term as vice chairman of the board on August 18, 2009. In August 2013, President Obama nominated him for a second term as board member and after Senate confirmation of his nomination, the President, in October 2013, designated him for a third term as vice chairman. He has served as acting NTSB chairman since April 26, 2014, and in July 2014 was nominated by the President to serve as chairman of the NTSB. He served as chairman until August 2017, when he was succeeded by Robert Sumwalt.

After his tenure at the NTSB Hart continued his work in the safety industry, chairing Washington DC's Metro Safety Commission and serving as a safety consultant for private companies such as Uber.

Hart has been chosen to serve as the chairman of the FAA's Joint Authorities Technical Review (JATR) team looking into the proposed fix for the Boeing 737 MAX groundings.

Political offices
Preceded by Deborah Hersman	Chairman of the National Transportation Safety Board; 2014–2017	Succeeded by Robert Sumwalt
