= Mark Rosenker =

United States Air Force general (1946–2020)

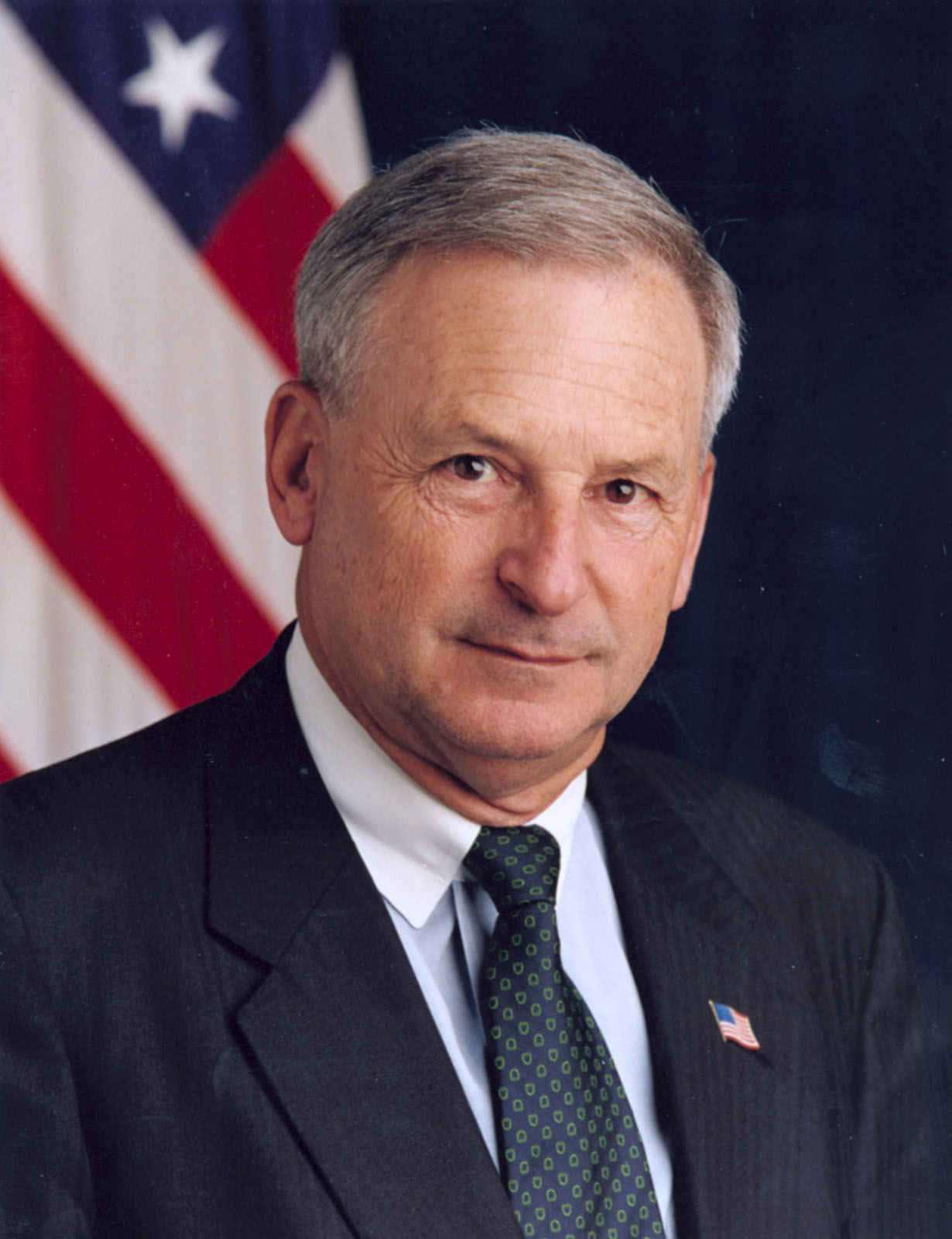
- Official portrait, 2003

11th Chair of the National Transportation Safety Board
- In office March 2005 – July 28, 2009; Acting: March 2005 – August 11, 2006
- President: George W. Bush; Barack Obama
- Preceded by: Ellen Engleman Conners
- Succeeded by: Deborah Hersman

Personal details
- Born: Mark Victor Rosenker; December 8, 1946 Baltimore, Maryland, U.S.
- Died: September 26, 2020 (aged 73) Alexandria, Virginia, U.S.
- Party: Republican
- Education: University of Maryland, College Park (BA); Air War College

Military service
- Branch/service: United States Air Force
- Years of service: 1969‍–‍2006
- Rank: Major general
- Awards: DSM (2); LM; MSM (2)

Mark Victor Rosenker (December 8, 1946 – September 26, 2020) was an American aviation official who served as the 11th chairman of the National Transportation Safety Board (NTSB) from August 2006 through August 2008. He was nominated by President George W. Bush and unanimously confirmed by the U.S. Senate. Chairman Rosenker was renominated by President Bush for a second term as chair and was going through the Senate confirmation process, which basically ended when President Obama was elected in November 2008. He served as acting chair starting in March 2005 to August 2006 and then again from August 2008 until his resignation from the board in August 2009, when he returned to private life. He died on September 26, 2020, from brain cancer at the age of 73.

== Military service ==
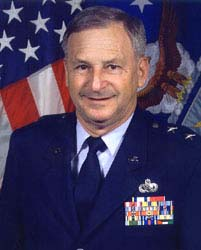
Mark Rosenker

Rosenker was a retired Air Force Reserve Major General. During his 37-year active duty and reserve career, Rosenker received numerous awards and decorations including the Air Force Distinguished Service Medal with One Oak Leaf Cluster and the Legion of Merit.

He was commissioned a 2nd Lieutenant in the USAF in June 1969 via the University of Maryland ROTC program. He began his active duty Air Force career in July 1969. He served five years as a civilian member of the Board of Visitors of the Community College of the Air Force. Rosenker graduated from the Air Command and Staff College and the Air War College.

== Government work ==
Rosenker was appointed by the president a board member of the NTSB beginning March 2003 after unanimous confirmation by the United States Senate and was designated vice chairman the following month by the president. He began a second 5-year term as a board member in January 2005 after another unanimous confirmation. In October 2017 Virginia Governor Terry McAuliffe appointed Rosenker to a 2-year term representing Virginia as a commissioner of the new Washington Metrorail Safety Commission. He was elected vice chairman of the commission on March 27, 2018.

From January 20, 2001, to November 2002 when President Bush nominated him for the NTSB, Rosenker served as deputy assistant to the President of the United States and director of the White House Military Office. Rosenker was traveling with President George W. Bush on September 11, 2001.

Rosenker has served in the Department of the Interior, the Federal Trade Commission, and the Commodity Futures Trading Commission as well as a brief assignment in the US Department of Transportation. Rosenker was appointed by President George H. W. Bush to serve on the American Battle Monuments Commission. During his career in civilian Federal service Mr. Rosenker received eight presidential appointments, three of which required Senate confirmation.

=== Piedmont Airlines Flight 22 investigation ===
As NTSB chairman, Rosenker ordered the 2006/2007 re-opening of the controversial 1967 investigation of Piedmont Airlines Flight 22. In the official petition for reconsideration, Paul Houle (an amateur historian who asked for the investigation to be reopened) suggested that numerous important facts were missing from the original investigation, as well as apparent potential conflicts of interest that should have been found at the time. Despite the cockpit voice recorder conflicting with the original NTSB report, the NTSB's Office of Aviation Safety found no compelling reason to make any changes to the report. Rosenker subsequently wrote to Houle, sharing the Board's findings upholding the probable cause and contributing factors as presented in the original NTSB report.

== Civilian work ==
Rosenker was Managing Director of the Washington, D.C. office for the United Network for Organ Sharing (UNOS) from Oct 1999 to January 2001 when he joined the White House Staff. Prior to working for UNOS, Rosenker was the Vice President, Public Affairs for the Electronic Industries Association for 23 years.

In April 2012, Rosenker was appointed by the Cruise Lines International Association (CLIA) to be a member of a special "Panel of Experts" to provide, advice, evaluation and assessment of potential new safety measures and best practices for improved cruise ship operations.

He was a member of the board of directors of the FLYHT Aerospace Corporation and Guest Services Inc. Rosenker was named to the Sequa Corporation Board of Directors (a Carlyle Group portfolio company) in August 2009 and stepped down from that board in February 2016. He also served on the board of governors of the Aerospace Industries Association for several years.

Rosenker was the transportation safety analyst for the CBS television and radio networks. Prior to that was a contributor to NBC News in the same role. Since retiring from the NTSB, he has appeared as a keynote speaker at numerous aviation and other transportation industry events. He has been a senior adviser to a number of industry sponsored coalitions advocating for safer roads.

Prior to his death, Rosenker was the president of the Transportation Safety Group LLC, a specialized consulting firm focused on transportation issues in the US and around the world.

He famously blamed the pilot and airlines safety standards in the Boeing 737 Max Lion Air crash and said “Certainly in the United States they understand how to operate this aircraft”.
