= Robert A. Sturgell =

American government official (born 1959)

Robert Allan Sturgell
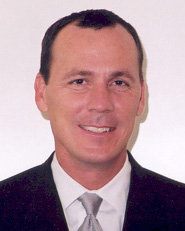
- Born: August 1, 1959 (age 66); Deale, Maryland, U.S.
- Occupations: Public Servant, Federal Aviation Administration (FAA) Acting Administrator (ret.)
- Children: Ben Sturgell

Robert Allan Sturgell (born August 1, 1959) is a former Acting Administrator of the Federal Aviation Administration (FAA), having served from September 14, 2007, to January 15, 2009. Appointed to the position on September 14, 2007, by President George W. Bush, he was never confirmed by the U.S. Senate. Prior to his appointment, he had served as Deputy Administrator of the FAA since 2003.

== Career ==
Sturgell has been a pilot in both civilian and military capacities. He graduated from the United States Naval Academy in 1982 and received his law degree from the University of Virginia Law School. He served as an instructor for the United States Navy Fighter Weapons School before retiring as a Commander, having flown the F-14, F-16, and F-18.

After his military career, he became a flight operations supervisor and line pilot for United Airlines, flying Boeing 757s and 767s on domestic and international routes. He also practiced aviation law in the Washington, D.C. area, and served as senior policy adviser at the National Transportation Safety Board (NTSB).

In 1998 Sturgell attempted to unseat Maryland Senate majority leader Democrat Thomas V. Mike Miller, Jr. in the 27th legislative district. He was defeated 69% to 31%.

On February 10, 2008, two Democratic United States Senators blocked the nomination of Robert Sturgell citing dissatisfaction with FAA Safety oversight and the agency's handling of claims of under staffing of air traffic controllers. This procedural maneuver prevented the full Senate from voting on the appointment. Although Sturgell blamed the Block on the NY/NY/PHL Airspace Redesign, Senator Frank Lautenberg of New Jersey had more pointed concerns.

Senator Lautenberg, said in a subsequent press release "Mr. Sturgell helped create the policies that left our air traffic controllers overworked and understaffed, our runways in dangerous condition, more air noise on our communities and the worst flight delays in our history. It's time for President Bush to nominate an Administrator who solves transportation problems, rather than creating more of them."

Bobby Sturgell is senior vice president of Washington Operations for Rockwell Collins. Sturgell's responsibilities include developing and implementing the company's governmental, regulatory, legislative, and industrial affairs strategies, and maintaining relationships with congressional members, staff, and other administration officials. He was named to this position in April 2009. In 2018, United Technologies acquired Rockwell Collins, merging it with their UTC Aerospace Systems subsidiary to form Collins Aerospace. In November of that year, Sturgell was named Collins Aerospace's Vice President for Government Programs. He has also served on the Executive Committee of the National Defense Industries Association.

Government offices
Preceded by Marion Blakey	Administrator of the Federal Aviation Administration; Acting; 2007–2009	Succeeded by Lynne Osmus; Acting
