= Professional Aviation Maintenance Association =

Aviation association

The Professional Aviation Maintenance Association (PAMA) is a professional organization for aviation maintenance technicians.

== History ==
On August 19, 1972, PAMA held its first annual convention in Pittsburgh, Pennsylvania. William Collister was elected as the first president of PAMA.

There are regional chapters of the association.

== Activities ==
Since late 1970th PAMA is publishing the PAMA News magazine.

In 2018, PAMA, along with other aviation organizations, expressed support to the United States Congress for the Aviation Maintenance Workforce Development Pilot Program.

In January 2019, PAMA, along with other aviation and travel organizations, signed a letter to President Donald Trump and Congress urging ending the 2018–2019 United States federal government shutdown.

In December 2019, PAMA, along with other aviation organizations, signed a letter to Congress in support of the Promoting Aviation Regulations for Technical Training (PARTT) 147 Act of 2019.

PAMA awards scholarships to aviation students in partnership with JSfirm.
