= Patricia A. Goldman =

American public servant and activist (1942–2023)

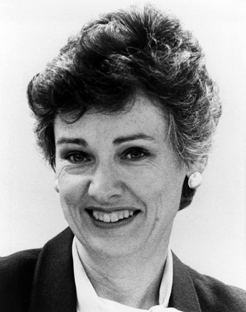

Member of the National Transportation Safety Board
- In office June 1979 – February 5, 1988: Vice Chair: April 1982 – February 5, 1988; Acting Chair: May 1986 – August 1986
- President: Jimmy Carter; Ronald Reagan
- Preceded by: Philip Hogue
- Succeeded by: Lee Dickinson

Personal details
- Born: Patricia Ann Goldman; March 22, 1942 Newton, New Jersey, U.S.
- Died: July 26, 2023 (aged 81) Washington, D.C., U.S.
- Party: Republican
- Spouse: Charles Goodell (m. 1978; died 1987) Stephen Kurzman (m. 1990)
- Education: Goucher College (BA)

Patricia Ann Goldman (March 22, 1942 – July 26, 2023) was an American public official and women's rights advocate. She served on the National Transportation Safety Board (NTSB) from 1979 to 1988, most of that time as vice chair.

An alumna of Goucher College, Goldman began her career in 1964 as a legislative assistant on Capitol Hill. She worked for various political organizations, directing the Wednesday Group (a group of liberal Republicans in the U.S. House of Representatives) and chairing the Republican Women's Task Force of the National Women's Political Caucus. She was appointed to the NTSB by President Jimmy Carter in 1979 and reappointed by Ronald Reagan in 1984.

In 1988, Goldman entered the private sector as a senior vice president for USAir. She was later president of the WISH List and the Ovarian Cancer National Alliance, which she co-founded and served on the board of the Chautauqua Foundation.

== Early life and education ==
Patricia Goldman was born in Newton, New Jersey, on March 22, 1942, to Jacob J. Goldman, a dentist, and Miriam L. (née Cassiday) Goldman, a former nurse and homemaker. Her mother was Catholic and her father Jewish; she was raised Catholic, and later converted to Judaism. She graduated from Goucher College, a women's liberal arts college in Towson, Maryland, with a bachelor's degree in economics in 1964.

== Career ==
=== National politics ===
Goldman began working in Washington, D.C., as a research assistant for the U.S. Congress's Joint Economic Committee during her senior year at Goucher in 1964. She arrived in the capital as an independent but soon joined the Republican Party. Though she planned to spend just a year there, she later joked, "I guess you could say I caught Potomac fever." From 1965 to 1966, she was a legislative assistant for an ad hoc U.S. House subcommittee focused on the War on Poverty (part of the Education and Labor Committee), hired by Representative Albert Quie as the Republican minority's lone staffer.

Goldman worked as a research consultant for the U.S. Chamber of Commerce in 1966 and then led poverty and workforce programs for the lobbying organization from 1967 to 1971 during a period of urban riots. She provided legislative counsel to the National League of Cities and the U.S. Conference of Mayors in 1971 and 1972. She also wrote freelance for the political magazine National Journal in 1972.

Politically, Goldman became aligned with the liberal wing of the Republican Party. She labeled herself variously an independent, progressive, moderate, feminist, and "thinking person," adding, "I don't think a Republican feminist is an oxymoron." She was one of the few Republicans present at the founding meeting of the National Women's Political Caucus (NWPC) in 1971. In 1985, Representative Olympia Snowe called her "just a wealth of information and advice" for women in politics.

Goldman was the executive director of the U.S. House's Wednesday Group, a caucus of liberal Republicans, from 1972 to 1979, coordinating legislative efforts among its 31 members. She was also a board member of the Ripon Society, a liberal Republican think tank. As the chair of the Republican Women's Task Force of the NWPC, at the 1976 Republican National Convention she helped secure the continued endorsement of the Equal Rights Amendment and tried to prevent the party platform from opposing Roe v. Wade.

She held teaching positions as a fellow at the Institute of Politics at Harvard Kennedy School; a lecturer at the Brookings Institution; and a visiting professor with the Woodrow Wilson National Fellowship Foundation, which sent her on visiting lectureships at universities across the country.

=== Transportation safety ===
Goldman was a member of the National Transportation Safety Board (NTSB), an independent federal agency, for almost nine years. On the recommendation of Representative Barbara Mikulski and others, President Jimmy Carter, a Democrat, nominated her to an open Republican seat on the board on March 16, 1979, to succeed Philip Hogue. Before her Senate confirmation, in a meeting with White House counsel Robert Lipshutz, she promised to recuse herself from potential issues involving interests of her husband, former Senator Charles Goodell, who consulted for the Concorde supersonic airliner and held stock in oil and rail. She had no prior technical knowledge but was trained on the job by staff experts.

President Ronald Reagan, a Republican, named Goldman the board's vice chair on April 17, 1982; reappointed her to the board on March 21, 1984; and renamed her vice chair on June 5, 1986. While some in the Republican Party considered her too liberal, the Air Line Pilots Association endorsed her renomination. She served as acting chair during a lapse in Jim Burnett's term from May to August 1986. As vice chair and chair, she and Burnett took alternate weeks serving as part of the NTSB's Go Team, which investigated major accidents. She was often quoted in the media as one of the "first investigators on the scene". Notable events investigated by Goldman included the 1980 collapse of the Sunshine Skyway Bridge in Tampa, the 1982 crashes of World Airways Flight 30 in Boston and Pan Am Flight 759 in New Orleans, and the 1984 derailment of Amtrak's Montrealer in Vermont.

A focus of the NTSB in the 1980s was the promotion of child safety seats, the nonuse of which the NTSB said contributed to 90 percent of infant fatalities in traffic collisions, which according to Goldman "could have been prevented by the proper use of child safety seats". Goldman and the NTSB petitioned for legislation in all fifty states to require the use of restraints for children under the age of four, something that was accomplished in 1985, and raised awareness to get the public to use them more frequently and correctly. She remembered of her service on the NTSB, "You could see the results of what you were doing. That was interesting and gratifying."

Goldman stepped down from the NTSB on February 5, 1988, replaced by Lee Dickinson and succeeded as vice chair by James Kolstad. The previous year, she had been floated as a possible successor to Transportation Secretary Elizabeth Dole. After leaving the board, Goldman joined the USAir Group as senior vice president of corporate communications on February 16, 1988. One of the highest-ranking women in the aviation industry at the time, she was in charge of internal and external communication at USAir until her retirement at age 51 on January 31, 1994.

=== Later career ===
In July 1985, Goldman participated in the World Conference on Women in Nairobi. She became the chair of the board of trustees of her alma mater, Goucher College, in August 1985, having joined the board four years earlier. She was the chair when, in May 1986, the board voted for the college to become coeducational, facing declines in enrollment but also opposition from some students. She received an honorary degree at Goucher's commencement in 2010.

Goldman served on the board of directors of Crown Central Petroleum from 1989 to 2000, and the Chautauqua Foundation from 1992 to 2003. In 1995, she became the president of the WISH List, a political action committee raising funds for female Republican candidates in favor of abortion rights. After surviving ovarian cancer, in 1997 she co-founded and was the president of the Ovarian Cancer National Alliance (OCNA), an advocacy and patient support organization, which merged into the Ovarian Cancer Research Alliance (OCRA) in 2016.

In April 2010, Toyota named Goldman to an independent six-person panel to investigate vehicle safety issues, which released a critical report in May 2011.

== Personal life ==
Goldman was the second wife of Charles Ellsworth Goodell, a Republican former senator from New York; they were married from July 1, 1978, until his death on January 21, 1987.

Goldman married Stephen Kurzman, a lawyer who served as Assistant Secretary for Legislation under Elliot Richardson in the Nixon administration's Department of Health, Education, and Welfare, on May 20, 1990; they met in the 1960s, when he worked in the U.S. Congress, as a staffer for U.S. Senator Jacob Javits. Beginning in the 1970s, she spent part of every summer at the Chautauqua Institution in Chautauqua, New York.

== Death ==
Goldman died of viral pneumonia in Washington, D.C., on July 26, 2023, at the age of 81.

== See also ==
- List of members of the National Transportation Safety Board
