= John Goglia =

American politician

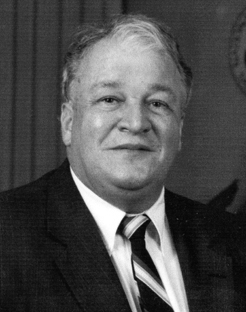
- Official portrait, c. 1995

Member of the National Transportation Safety Board
- In office August 1995 – June 18, 2004
- President: Bill Clinton; George W. Bush
- Preceded by: John Lauber
- Succeeded by: Deborah Hersman

Personal details
- Born: John Joseph Goglia; May 18, 1944 (age 82) Boston, Massachusetts, U.S.
- Party: Independent
- Spouse: Patricia Guarino (died 2010)
- Occupation: Consultant; author; aircraft mechanic; union official

John Joseph Goglia (born May 18, 1944) is an American aviation safety consultant and former member of the National Transportation Safety Board (NTSB). He is the president of the Professional Aviation Maintenance Association. A native of Boston, Massachusetts, he was the first Federal Aviation Administration-certified aircraft maintenance technician to serve as a member of the NTSB. Goglia graduated from The English High School in 1962.

== Career ==
Goglia chaired the NTSB's hearing regarding the crash of ValuJet Flight 592 in 1997. He argued that ValuJet was among the parties primarily responsible for the crash.

In 2016, Goglia began teaching at Vaughn College of Aeronautics and Technology.

In 2024, he was announced as one of the 2025 inductees into the National Aviation Hall of Fame. In 2025, he estimated he had made more than 100 television appearances in his career as a pundit discussing flight-related matters.

Goglia played a significant part in the second season of the reality-comedy television series The Rehearsal, which aired on HBO in 2025. After the show finished airing, Goglia and Nathan Fielder appeared on CNN together to promote the comedy TV show. Goglia subsequently wrote an op-ed about air safety for The Hill, where he discussed his experience on The Rehearsal.

== Personal life ==
He was married to the former Patricia "Patty" Guarino until her death in 2010.

Government offices
Preceded by John Lauber	Member of the National Transportation Safety Board; 1995–2004	Succeeded by Deborah Hersman
