= Tho Bella Dinh-Zarr =

American public official

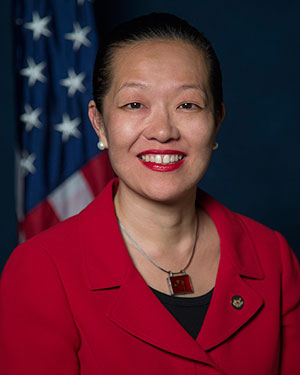

42nd Member of the National Transportation Safety Board
- In office March 2015 – December 2018
- President: Barack Obama
- Preceded by: Deborah Hersman
- Succeeded by: Michael Graham

Personal details
- Education: Rice University(BA); University of Texas School of Public Health (MPH,PhD)

Tho Bella Dinh-Zarr is an American public health scientist, specializing in injury prevention. Dinh-Zarr was the 42nd Member of the National Transportation Safety Board, and served as vice-chairman and acting chairman.

== Education ==
Dinh-Zarr attended public schools in Galveston, Texas. She graduated from Ball High School in Galveston, and Rice University where she earned a Bachelor's degree in Spanish. She has a Master of Public Health (MPH) and a Doctorate (PhD) from the University of Texas School of Public Health. Her PhD dissertation was "Reviews of evidence regarding interventions to increase the use of safety belts". In high school, Dinh-Zarr worked at the Railroad Museum on Galveston Island, built latrines in Paraguay, and in college she studied Latin American literature in Chile.

== Career ==
Dinh-Zarr was the U.S. director and road-safety director of the FIA Foundation until 2014. While at the NTSB, Dinh-Zarr was known for her support of 0.05% BAC Laws to prevent drunk driving and positive train control (PTC). She cast the dissenting vote on the proposal to lessen the importance of PTC. Dinh-Zarr helped to investigate disasters such as the sinking of the El Faro and the 2016 Hoboken train crash. After her term ended, Dinh-Zarr co-founded the .05 Saves Lives Coalition, its mission to advocate for a .05 BAC law in every state.
