= TWA Flight 159 =

1967 aviation accident

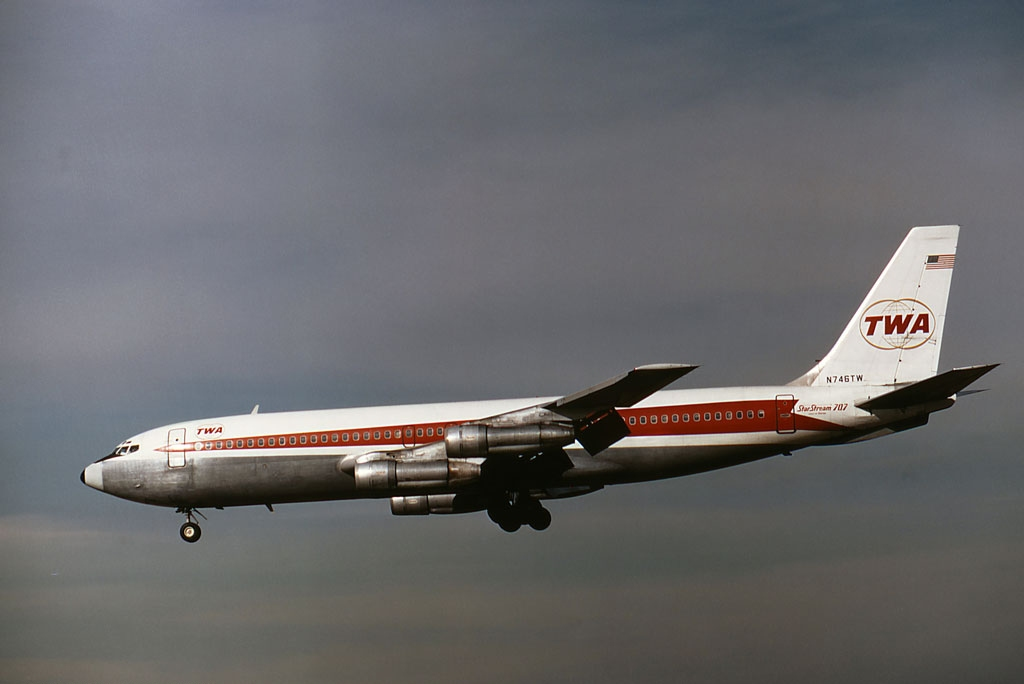
- A TWA Boeing 707-131; sister ship to the accident aircraft

Accident
- Date: November 6, 1967
- Site: Cincinnati/Northern Kentucky International Airport, Kentucky, US; 39°03′N 84°40′W

Aircraft
- Aircraft type: Boeing 707-131
- Operator: Trans World Airlines (TWA)
- IATA flight No.: TW159
- ICAO flight No.: TWA159
- Call sign: TWA 159
- Registration: N742TW
- Flight origin: John F. Kennedy International Airport
- Stopover: Cincinnati/Northern Kentucky International Airport
- Destination: Los Angeles International Airport
- Occupants: 36
- Passengers: 29
- Crew: 7
- Fatalities: 1
- Injuries: 10
- Survivors: 35

Trans World Airlines (TWA) Flight 159 was a regularly scheduled American passenger flight from New York City to Los Angeles, California, with a stopover in Cincinnati/Northern Kentucky International Airport, Kentucky, that crashed after an aborted takeoff from Cincinnati on November 6, 1967. The Boeing 707 attempted to abort takeoff when the copilot became concerned that the aircraft had collided with a disabled Douglas DC-9 on the runway. The aircraft overran the runway, struck an embankment and caught fire. One passenger died as a result of the accident.

The National Transportation Safety Board (NTSB) concluded that the crash occurred due to the TWA flight crew's inability to successfully abort takeoff due to the speed of the aircraft, and that a runway overrun was unavoidable at the 707's speed. The disabled DC-9, a Delta Air Lines flight which had reported that it had cleared the runway when in fact it had not, was a contributing factor in the crash. The NTSB recommended that the Federal Aviation Administration (FAA) establish and publicize standards of safe clearance from runway edges for both aircraft and ground vehicles which also take into account the exhaust fumes of jet engines. The board also recommended a reevaluation of training manuals and aircraft procedures in regard to abort procedures.

== Background ==
=== Aircraft ===
The aircraft was a Boeing 707 which had accumulated 26,319 airframe hours since its first flight in 1959.

=== Crew ===
It was piloted by Captain Volney D. Matheny, 45, who had 18,753 hours of pilot time. The copilot was First Officer Ronald G. Reichardt, 26, with 1,629 total piloting hours, and the flight engineer was Robert D. Barron, 39, who had accumulated 11,182 hours as a flight engineer.

== Flight history and accident ==
Flight 159 was a New York City–Los Angeles flight with an intermediate stop at Greater Cincinnati Airport. The flight operated from New York to Cincinnati without incident.

At 18:38 Eastern Standard Time, Flight 159 was approaching Cincinnati's runway 27L for takeoff, and was instructed by the tower controller to "taxi into position and hold" on the runway. As Flight 159 approached Runway 27L, another flight, Delta Air Lines Flight 379 (DAL 379), a DC-9 (N3317L), was coming in to land on the same runway. After landing, DAL 379 received permission to turn 180° to reach an intersection they had passed, but the DC-9 was unable to complete the turn and ran off the paved runway. While most of the aircraft was stuck in the mud well away from the runway, the tail was only approximately 7 feet (2.1 m) from the edge of the runway. The rearmost exterior light on DAL 379 was 45 feet (14 m) from the edge of the runway, which might have caused DAL 379 to appear at a distance to be farther from the runway than it actually was.

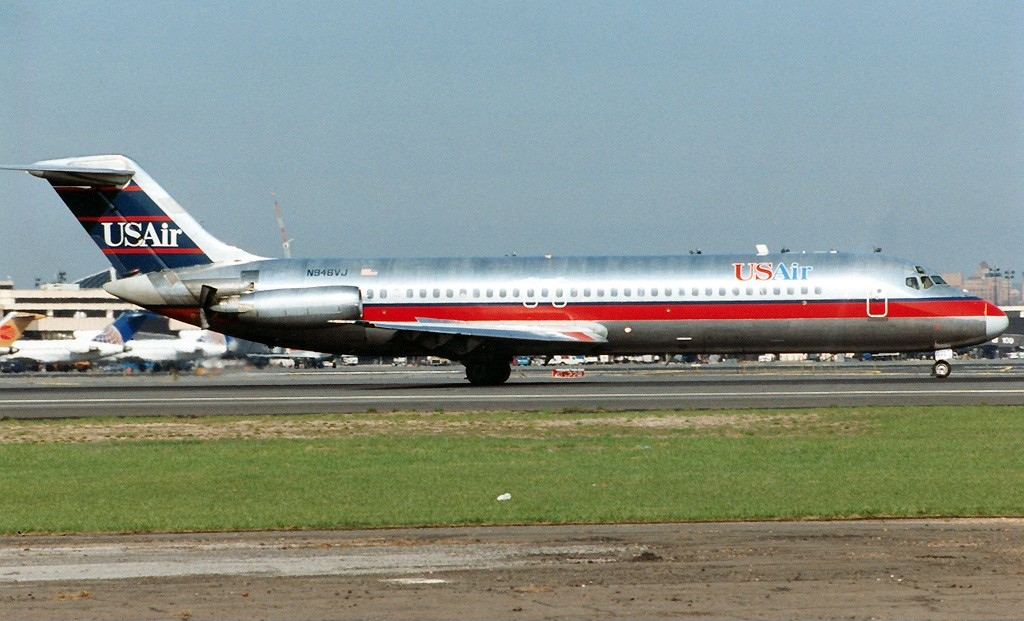
The DC-9 involved, pictured in 1993 under USAir

At 18:39, while DAL 379 was in the process of clearing the runway, Flight 159 was cleared for takeoff. Before Flight 159 began moving, the tower controller observed that DAL 379 had stopped moving, and called DAL 379 to confirm they were clear of the runway. The captain of the Delta DC-9 replied, "Yeah, we're in the dirt though." The tower controller then advised TWA 159 that DAL 379 was clear of the runway, and that Flight 159 was cleared for takeoff. With the first officer operating the controls, Flight 159 then began its takeoff roll down runway 27L.

Neither pilot aboard Flight 159 initially saw how close DAL 379 was to the runway. As Flight 159 sped down the runway, the captain observed that the DC-9 was "off the runway" by only "five, six, seven feet or something of that nature." As the Boeing 707 passed the Delta plane, the pilots heard a loud bang which coincided with a movement of the flight controls and a yawing motion of the aircraft. Thinking he had hit the DC-9, Flight 159's first officer attempted to abort the takeoff, and both pilots attempted to use their aircraft's thrust reversers, brakes, and spoilers to stop the aircraft.

The aircraft overran the end of the runway, went over the edge of a hill, and became airborne for 67 feet (20 m). It then struck the ground again, shearing off the main landing gear and displacing the nosewheel rearward. The Boeing 707 slid down an embankment and came to rest 421 feet (128 m) from the end of the runway. The fuselage ruptured, and the structure of one wing failed during the crash. The right side wing of the plane caught fire as it left the runway. All 29 passengers and 7 crew members escaped the aircraft, with two passengers requiring hospitalization. One of the hospitalized passengers died as a result of injuries four days after the accident. The 707 was damaged beyond repair and regarded as a complete write off after the fire damaged the right wing and broken fuselage.

== Aftermath ==
The NTSB investigated the accident. Although the tail of the Delta DC-9 was several feet from the runway, the NTSB determined that DAL 379's engines were still operating at idle when Flight 159 attempted to take off, and DAL 379's idling jet engines were directing hot jet exhaust over the runway. The NTSB determined that neither FAA regulations nor the Terminal Air Traffic Control Procedures Manual defined the phrase "clear of the runway," and found that the pilots of each plane and the air traffic controller each had their own slightly different definition of the term. The NTSB concluded that DAL 379 was not actually "clear of the runway" because its jet exhaust continued to pose a hazard to aircraft attempting to use runway 27L.

The jet blast from DAL 379 caused a compressor stall in Flight 159's number four engine. The compressor stall caused a loud noise heard by the pilots, and the jet blast caused a movement of the Boeing 707's flight controls during the takeoff. The 707 did not make contact with the DC-9, but the noise and movement convinced the first officer that a collision had occurred. The NTSB concluded that the first officer's decision to abort was reasonable under the circumstances.

TWA company manuals indicated that aborting a takeoff at high speeds is dangerous, and should only be attempted if an actual engine failure occurs before V_{1} speed. "V_{1}" speed is the maximum speed at which the takeoff can be safely aborted; after V_{1} speed is exceeded, the plane must take off to avoid overrunning the runway. The captain of Flight 159 failed to announce that Flight 159 had achieved V_{1} speed, and the first officer believed the plane was at or near V_{1} (rather than having substantially exceeded V_{1}) when he aborted the takeoff. On a Boeing 707, the V_{1} speed is 132 knots (244 km/h; 152 mph); Flight 159 achieved a peak speed of 145 knots (269 km/h; 167 mph). However, the NTSB determined that V_{1} was not relevant to this incident because it is only intended to advise pilots on whether they can abort after engine failure, and the first officer believed that his aircraft had been physically damaged and might not be capable of flight. As a result, the NTSB determined the first officer's decision to abort to be reasonable, but criticized the pilots for failing to execute the abort rapidly.

The majority opinion presented by the NTSB accident report determined that the cause of the accident was the TWA flight crew's inability to successfully abort takeoff procedures due to an excess of speed. The NTSB recommended revisions and expansions to airline abort procedures and new FAA regulations defining runway clearance and procedures, taking into account jet engine exhaust.

One NTSB board member, Francis H. McAdams, wrote in a separate dissenting opinion that he would have concluded that an abort was both reasonable and necessary under the circumstances, despite the fact that the aircraft had exceeded V_{1} and was certain to overrun the runway. McAdams said that he would have found the probable cause of the accident to be the Delta crew's failure to adequately advise the tower of the proximity to the runway, and the tower's failure to request additional and precise information prior to clearing TWA 159 for takeoff.

The family of the deceased passenger received a $105,000 settlement from Delta Air Lines in civil court. TWA also sued Delta for the loss of the Boeing 707 aircraft, and reached a settlement of $2,216,000.

== See also ==
- List of accidents and incidents involving airliners in the United States
