= Marion Blakey =

American politician and statesperson

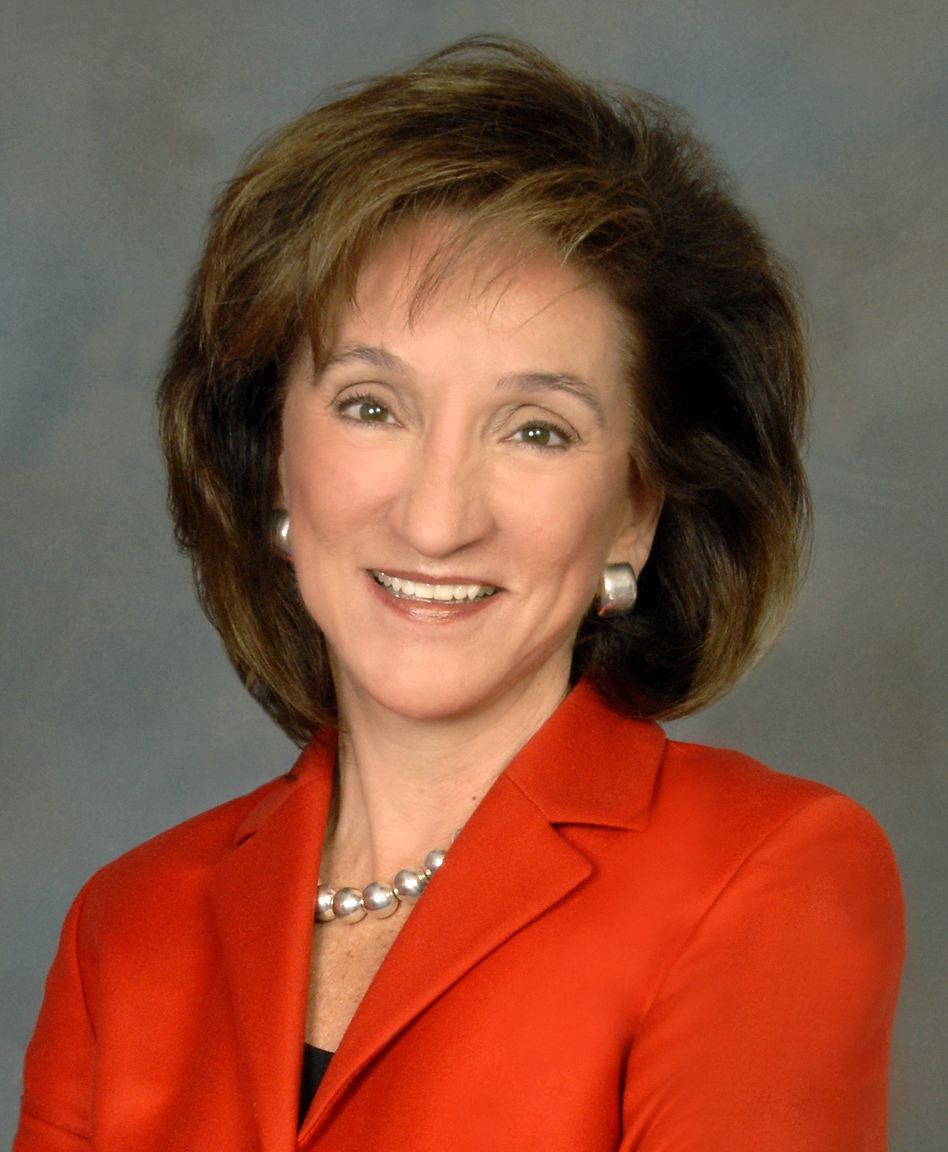

15th Administrator of the Federal Aviation Administration
- In office September 12, 2002 – September 13, 2007
- President: George W. Bush
- Preceded by: Jane Garvey
- Succeeded by: Robert Sturgell (Acting)

9th Chair of the National Transportation Safety Board
- In office September 26, 2001 – September 12, 2002
- President: George W. Bush
- Preceded by: James Hall
- Succeeded by: Ellen Conners

Personal details
- Born: March 26, 1948 (age 78) Gadsden, Alabama, U.S.
- Party: Republican
- Spouse: William Dooley
- Children: 1
- Education: University of Mary Washington (BA)

Marion Clifton Blakey (born March 26, 1948) is an American businesswoman and former government official who served as president and CEO of Rolls-Royce North America. Prior to joining Rolls-Royce, she served as the eighth full-time chief executive of the Aerospace Industries Association, an American defense industry trade association from 2007 to 2015. Before this, she served a five-year term as the 15th Administrator of the Federal Aviation Administration. Blakey was the second woman to hold the position, serving as a successor to Jane Garvey, the first woman to hold the Administrator title. She was the second Administrator who was not a licensed pilot. She was awarded the Wright Brothers Memorial Trophy in 2013.

== Early life and education ==
Blakey was born in Gadsden, Alabama. She received her bachelor's degree with honors in international studies from Mary Washington College of the University of Virginia in 1970. She also attended the Paul H. Nitze School of Advanced International Studies at Johns Hopkins University for graduate work in Middle East Affairs.

== Career ==
From 1993 to 2001, Blakey was the principal of Blakey & Associates, now Blakey & Agnew, a Washington, D.C. public affairs consulting firm with a particular focus on transportation issues and traffic safety.

Blakey has held six previous Presidential appointments, four of which required Senate confirmation. From 1992 to 1993, Blakey served as administrator of the Department of Transportation's National Highway Traffic Safety Administration (NHTSA). As the nation's leading highway safety official, she was charged with reducing deaths, injuries, and economic losses resulting from motor vehicle crashes. Prior to her service at NHTSA, she held key positions at the United States Department of Commerce, the United States Department of Education, the National Endowment for the Humanities, the White House, and the United States Department of Transportation. For instance, in 1989 Blakey was appointed as a member of the Commission on Presidential Scholars. Prior to that, she was Deputy Assistant to the President for Public Affairs and Communications Planning at the White House. Prior to this Blakey was director of public affairs and special assistant to the Secretary at the U.S. Department of Education. From 1982 to 1984, she was director of public affairs at the National Endowment for the Humanities. Previously Blakey served as director of that agency's youth programs and in its Office of Planning and Policy Assessment.

=== NTSB Chair ===
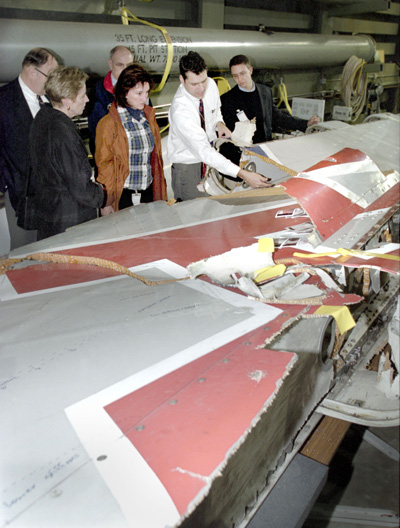
NTSB Chairman Marion Blakey (third from right) during the investigation of the tail fin and rudder from American Airlines flight 587

Prior to being named FAA Administrator, Blakey served as chairman of the National Transportation Safety Board (NTSB) from September 26, 2001, to September 13, 2002. During her tenure, she led a number of accident investigations including the crash of American Airlines Flight 587 in November 2001, dealing with both the highly technical aspects of the investigation as well as the highly charged public interest in the accident. Blakey worked to significantly improve the Board's accident reporting process and increased industry and regulatory responsiveness to NTSB safety recommendations. Additionally, Blakey strengthened the Board's advocacy and outreach programs to promote safer travel throughout all modes of transportation. She also furthered development of the NTSB Academy as an international resource to enhance aviation safety and accident investigations.

=== FAA Administrator ===
Blakey was sworn in on September 13, 2002 as the 15th Administrator of the Federal Aviation Administration, following her appointment by George W. Bush during his first term in office. Her commission as FAA Administrator ended on September 13, 2007.

During Blakey's tenure as Administrator, the National Airspace System absorbed major air traffic growth, which contributed to flight delays during early implementation of the Next Generation Air Transportation System (NextGen), which is slated to replace the aging air traffic control (ATC) system. Just prior to departure as administrator, she attributed the increased delays on poor scheduling by the airlines at busy airports. Blakey also attributed delays to bad weather, increased regional jet traffic, fewer air traffic controllers in the system and failures or delays attributed to the antiquated air traffic system which she worked to replace with NextGen. Senator Charles Schumer of the opposition Democratic Party publicly blamed the FAA for the delays, and called for Blakey's resignation. Shortly after her tenure ended, on September 25, 2007, the Office of the Inspector General issued a report stating, "Based on the first 7 months of the year, it is clear that 2007 may be the busiest travel period since the peak of 2000 and may surpass the 2000 record levels for flight delays, cancellations, and diversions."

The FAA declared an impasse over contract negotiations and imposed work rules including partial pay caps for veteran controllers and an alternative, lower pay scale for new hires on the air traffic controller workforce, represented by the National Air Traffic Controllers Association (NATCA). The five-year labor contract in dispute was imposed on Labor Day in 2006 after Congress failed to intervene. The FAA thus imposed a unilateral reduction in pay scale of approximately 30 percent on active air traffic controllers only—all other FAA employees, including air traffic staff (those air traffic employees not directly involved in the control of air traffic) and supervisors/management retained their pay scales. The following year the Federal Labor Relations Authority ruled against NATCA's 2006 grievance. In 2006, Blakey said the agency's final proposal would result in current controllers earning an average of $187,000 a year in pay and benefits after five-years, up from the current $166,000 average. NATCA disputed those figures, saying they included overtime needed because of staffing shortages.

In May 2006, she did not anticipate increased retirements saying, "I was very surprised that the union said that there would be retirements triggered under the current proposal." However, 828 controllers retired, exceeding the FAA's initial and revised forecasts. The FAA noted that the agency hired over 1,400 new air traffic controller trainees and employed 14,874 nationwide exceeding 2007's target. Trainees normally take three to five years to complete their training.

In August 2007, a month before departing the FAA, Blakey described the current National Airspace System saying, "We are at a breaking point," and called for deployment of the Next Generation Air Transportation System, in order to improve air traffic capacity. The new system was to be funded by a controversial new FAA funding structure based on user fees, but in 2007 Congress instead opted to fund the program by increasing the tax on general-aviation jet fuel.

She became president and Chief Executive Officer of the industry trade association, Aerospace Industries Association, on Nov. 12, 2007. Her move to the new role was criticized at the time by Citizens for Responsibility and Ethics in Washington, the Project On Government Oversight, and by Rep. Henry Waxman of the opposition Democratic Party, on the grounds that the AIA represents firms that the FAA oversaw and awarded contracts to during her five-year tenure. Blakey said at the time that she had not taken a direct role in any regulatory action that affected the AIA, which represents aircraft manufacturers and defense contractors, and that she was "taken aback and a little appalled, frankly" at the issues being raised.

During Congressional testimony February 11, 2009, NATCA President Pat Forrey testified that 3,356 controllers left the active work force in the two years after the work rules were imposed by Blakey, and "Since the implementation of the imposed work rules, the FAA lost more than 46,000 years of air traffic control experience through retirements alone. Nearly one third (27 percent) of air traffic controllers in the FAA have less than five years experience, and 40 air traffic control facilities have more than half of its workforce composed of individuals with less than five years experience."

== Personal life ==
She is married to William Ryan Dooley.

Government offices
Preceded by James Hall	Chair of the National Transportation Safety Board; 2001–2002	Succeeded by Ellen Conners
Preceded by Jane Garvey	Administrator of the Federal Aviation Administration; 2002–2007	Succeeded by Robert Sturgell; Acting
