= Robert L. Sumwalt (U.S. government official) =

American pilot and government official (born 1956)

Robert Sumwalt
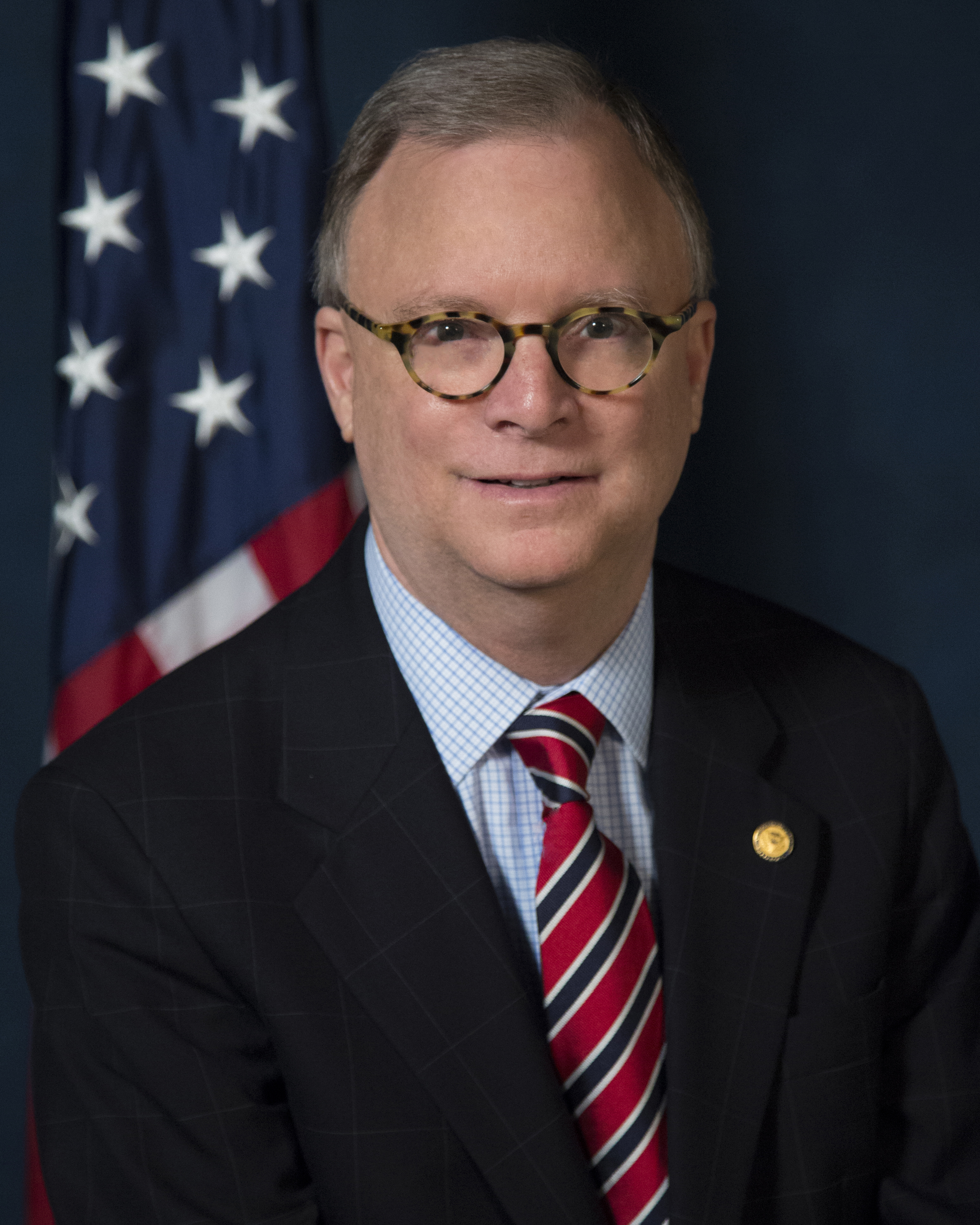

14th Chair of the National Transportation Safety Board
- In office August 10, 2017 – June 30, 2021
- President: Donald Trump; Joe Biden
- Deputy: Bruce Landsberg
- Preceded by: Christopher A. Hart
- Succeeded by: Jennifer Homendy

Member of the National Transportation Safety Board
- In office August 21, 2006 – June 30, 2021
- President: George W. Bush; Barack Obama; Donald Trump; Joe Biden
- Preceded by: Richard Healing
- Succeeded by: Alvin Brown

Personal details
- Born: Robert Llewellyn Sumwalt III; June 30, 1956 (age 70) Columbia, South Carolina, U.S.
- Relatives: Robert L. Sumwalt Jr. (father); Robert L. Sumwalt (grandfather)
- Education: University of South Carolina (BS); Embry–Riddle Aeronautical University (MS)

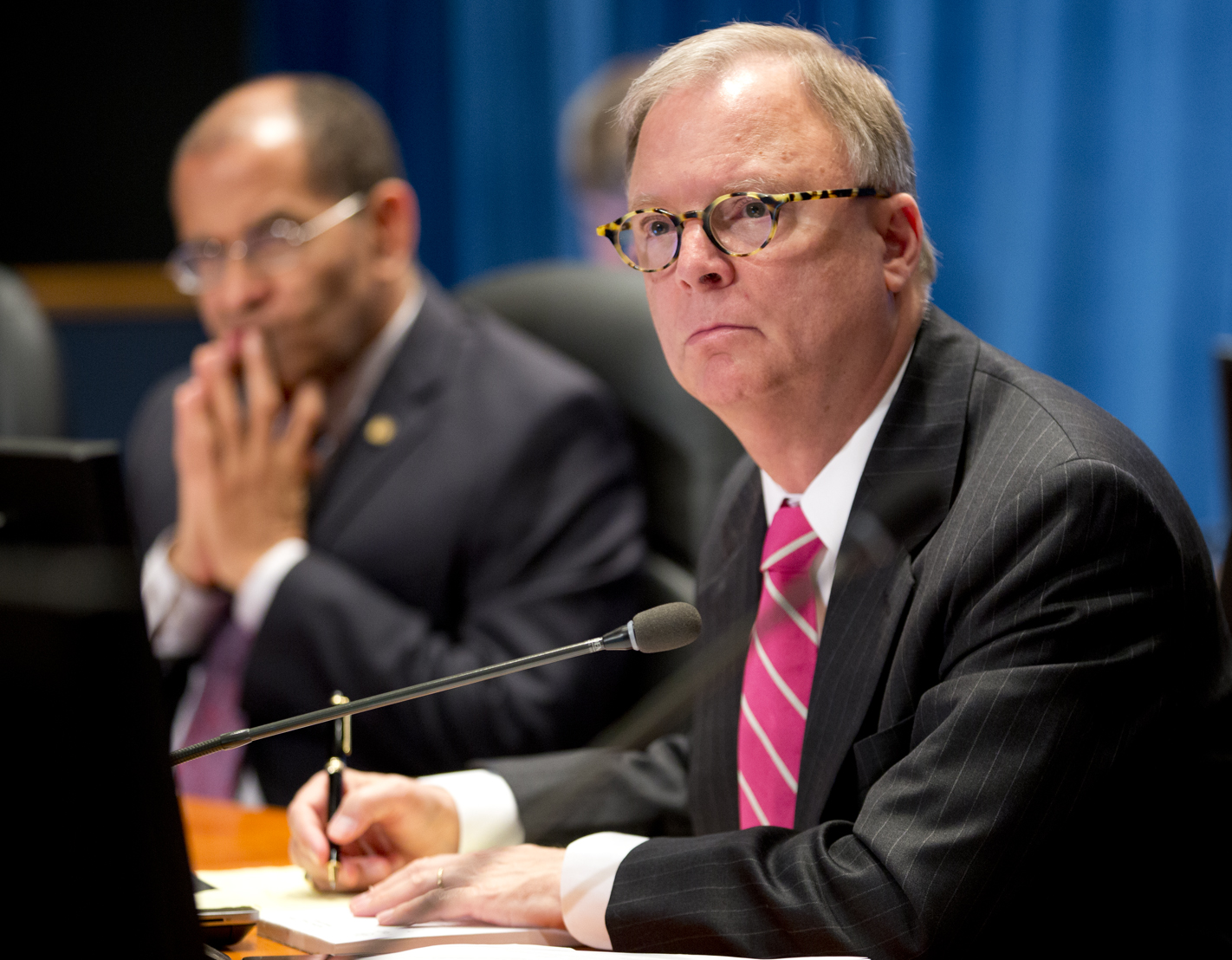
Sumwalt (right) at a 2015 hearing on a crash in the Washington Metro system

Robert Llewellyn Sumwalt III (born June 30, 1956) is an American academic, aviator, government official and writer. He was a board member of the National Transportation Safety Board for over 15 years, from August 2006 to June 30, 2021, serving as the agency's chairman from 2017 to 2021. He currently serves as the executive director of Embry-Riddle's Boeing Center for Aviation and Aerospace Safety.

== Education ==
He holds a Bachelor of Science degree from the University of South Carolina and a Master of Aeronautical Science (with Distinction) from Embry–Riddle Aeronautical University, specializing in Aviation/Aerospace Safety Systems and Human Factors Aviation Systems.

== Career ==
Sumwalt began his career as an airline pilot, working for 24 years with Piedmont Airlines and US Airways. He logged over 14,000 flight hours and earned type ratings in five aircraft. After his airline career, he joined SCANA, a Fortune 500 energy company, where he managed its corporate aviation department.

Sumwalt worked on special assignment to the US Airways Flight Safety Department where he was involved in the development of numerous airline-safety programs. He served on the US Airways Flight Operational Quality Assurance (FOQA) Monitoring Team.

Sumwalt served as an air safety representative for Air Line Pilots Association (ALPA) for 17 years where he chaired ALPA's Human Factors and Training Group. He was a co-founder of that organization's Critical Incident Response Program, which provides guidance to airline personnel involved in traumatic events such as accidents.

From 1991 to 1999, Sumwalt conducted aviation-safety research as a consultant to NASA's Aviation Safety Reporting System, where he studied flight-crew human factors.

Sumwalt co-authored a book on aircraft accidents and he wrote chapters pertaining to aircraft accident investigation in two books. He has written extensively on aviation-safety matters, having published over 90 articles and papers.

In 2003, Sumwalt joined the faculty of the University of Southern California's Aviation Safety and Security Program, where he was the primary human-factors instructor.

He was sworn in as the 37th member of the National Transportation Safety Board on August 21, 2006, whereupon President George W. Bush designated him as vice chairman of the board for a two-year term. In November 2011, President Barack Obama reappointed Sumwalt to an additional five-year term. In March 2017, President Donald Trump reappointed Sumwalt to a five-year term expiring on December 31, 2021, and designated him as Vice Chairman for a term of two years. President Trump subsequently nominated Sumwalt to be NTSB chairman, and in August 2017, the U.S. Senate confirmed Sumwalt to be NTSB's 14th chairman. In 2019, President Trump again nominated him for Chairman of the NTSB. He was reconfirmed by the U.S. Senate in July 2019 for a three-year term as chairman. He succeeded Christopher A. Hart in this role.

While on the board, he was an advocate for improving safety in all modes of transportation, including teen-driver safety, impaired driving, distractions in transportation, and several rail-safety initiatives.

In 2018 while discussing Air Canada Flight 759, Sumwalt described NOTAMs as "a bunch of garbage that nobody pays any attention to". This led to an initiative to reform the NOTAM system.

Sumwalt retired from chairmanship and membership of NTSB on June 30, 2021. In addition to his current role with Embry-Riddle, Sumwalt is a safety analyst with CBS News and volunteer board member of the Alliance for Innovation and Infrastructure.

== Honors ==
In recognition of his contributions to the aviation industry, in September 2021, Sumwalt was awarded the Flight Safety Foundation - Boeing Aviation Safety Lifetime Achievement Award. He also received the Flight Safety Foundation's Laura Taber Barbour Award in 2003 and ALPA's Air Safety Award in 2005. He is a 2009 inductee into the South Carolina Aviation Hall of Fame. In recognition of his accomplishments, Sumwalt was awarded an honorary Doctor in Science degree from the University of South Carolina and an Honorary Doctorate Degree from Embry-Riddle Aeronautical University.

== Publications ==
- Walters, James M Walters; Sumwalt, Robert L. (2000). Aircraft Accident Analysis – Final Reports. New York City, New York: McGraw-Hill. ISBN 978-0-071-3-51492.

== See also ==
- List of Embry–Riddle Aeronautical University alumni
- List of University of South Carolina people
- List of University of Southern California people

Political offices
Preceded by Christopher A. Hart	Chair of the National Transportation Safety Board; 2017–2021	Succeeded by Jennifer Homendy
