= Robert L. Sumwalt (academic) =

President of the University of South Carolina
- In office 1957–1962
- Preceded by: Donald S. Russell
- Succeeded by: Thomas F. Jones

Personal details
- Born: July 8, 1895 Baltimore, Maryland, U.S.
- Died: January 24, 1977 (aged 81) Columbia, South Carolina, U.S.
- Spouse: Caroline Causey
- Relations: Robert L. Sumwalt (son), Robert L. Sumwalt III (grandson)
- Education: University of Delaware, Massachusetts Institute of Technology
- Profession: engineer

Robert Llewellyn Sumwalt (July 8, 1895 – January 24, 1977) was an American engineer and academic, who was President of the University of South Carolina.

Sumwalt was born in Baltimore on July 8, 1895. He began undergraduate studies at Delaware College in 1914, belonged to the Sigma Nu fraternity there, and received a B.S. degree in 1918, for which his thesis was "The Design of A Type Emergency Mill Building".

== Background ==
In 1919, he was serving in the Engineers Corps. He received from University of Delaware (the successor to the college) a professional degree for which he wrote a 1921 thesis on the construction of a mental hospital.

Pierre S. du Pont, who was a patron of the university, had in 1918 begun a correspondence with Sumwalt (which continued for decades, into the year of Du Pont's death), and assisted Sumwalt financially while he was earning his SBCE at MIT.

Sumwalt married Caroline Causey by 1927, and his son, Robert Llewellyn Sumwalt Jr, was born the next year.

Sumwalt joined the faculty of the University of South Carolina as assistant professor in 1926, becoming full professor in 1931 and dean of the School of Engineering in 1943. He became the university's acting president in 1957, then president in 1959 and continuing to 1962.

After 36 years working at the university, he retired and was employed on the professional staff of the Senate Post Office and Civil Service Committee.

UofSC has established chairs in mathematics and chemistry bearing his name and named a building within the college of engineering in his honor. Sumwalt died on January 24, 1977.
