= Robert L. Sumwalt (entrepreneur) =

American businessman

Robert Llewellyn Sumwalt Jr. (29 December 1927 – 11 June 2016) was an American entrepreneur and businessman who had a successful career as an engineer and general contractor, concentrating on commercial building.

== Biography ==
He was born to engineer and academic Robert L. Sumwalt and Caroline Causey on December 29, 1927 in Columbia, South Carolina.

In 1949, he graduated from the University of South Carolina, where his father then headed the engineering school, and in 1950 from the Massachusetts Institute of Technology with a MSci. Sumwalt launched his engineering career at DuPont's offices in Camden, South Carolina. He later founded McCrory-Sumwalt Construction Co. and later Sumwalt Construction Co. He retired from his position as President in 2003.

On March 8, 1952 he married Joyce Mills in Christ Church near the bride's home in Georgetown, Washington DC. Elizabeth S. Clark and Robert L. Sumwalt III are their two children.
