= Aeroméxico Flight 498 =

1986 mid-air collision over California

- Aeroméxico Flight 498 during its final descent. The horizontal stabilizer is shown to be missing in the photo.

Accident
- Date: August 31, 1986
- Summary: Mid-air collision
- Site: Cerritos, California, U.S.; 33°52′05″N 118°02′44″W
- Total fatalities: 82
- Total injuries: 8
- Total survivors: 0

First aircraft
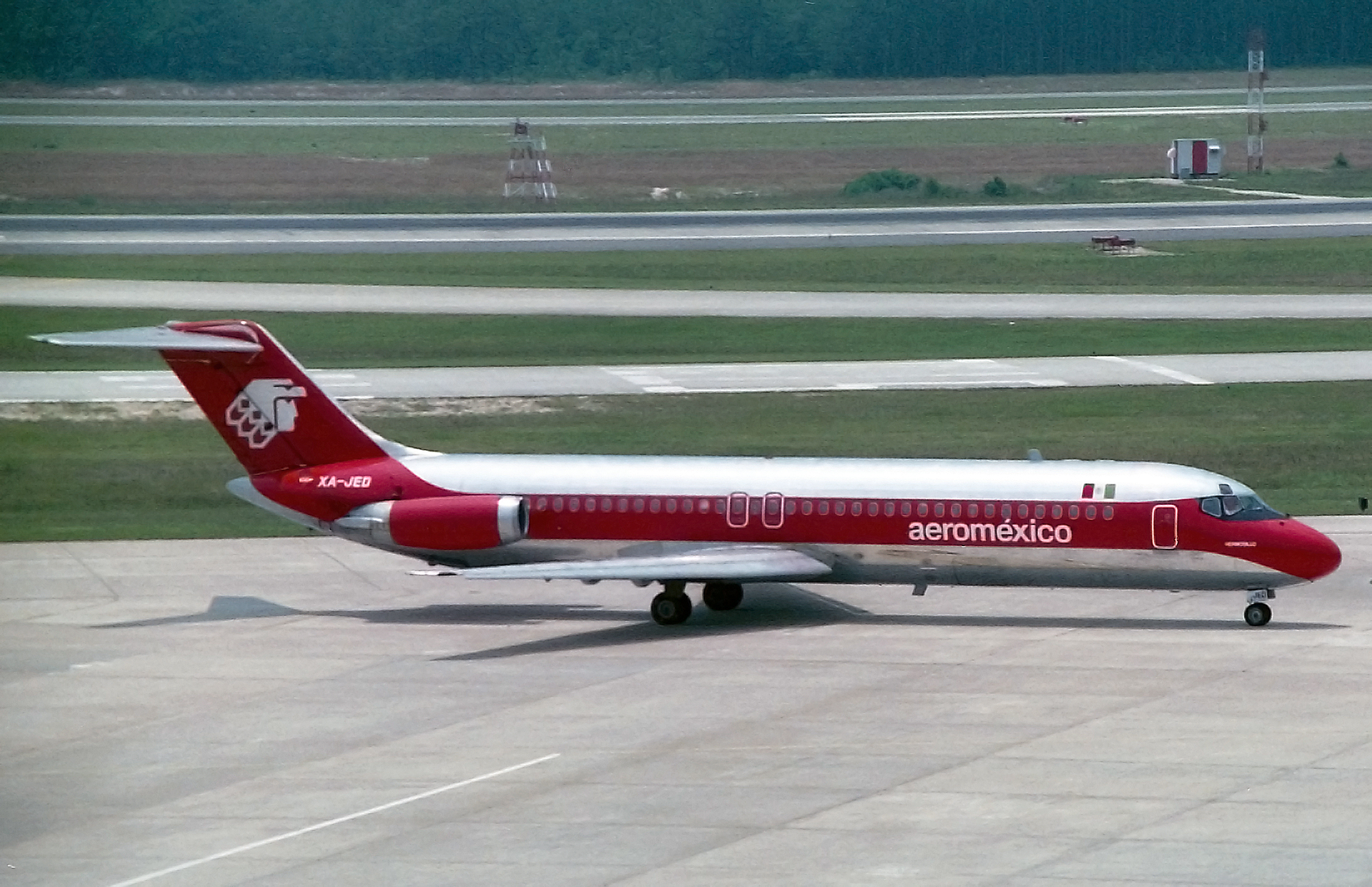
- XA-JED, the McDonnell Douglas DC-9-32 involved in the collision, seen in 1982
- Type: McDonnell Douglas DC-9-32
- Name: Hermosillo
- Operator: Aeroméxico
- IATA flight No.: AM498
- ICAO flight No.: AMX498
- Call sign: AEROMEXICO 498
- Registration: XA-JED
- Flight origin: Mexico City International Airport; Mexico City, Mexico
- 1st stopover: Miguel Hidalgo y Costilla International Airport; Guadalajara, Jalisco, Mexico
- 2nd stopover: Loreto International Airport; Loreto, Baja California Sur, Mexico
- Last stopover: General Abelardo L. Rodríguez International Airport; Tijuana, Baja California, Mexico
- Destination: Los Angeles International Airport; Los Angeles, California, U.S.
- Occupants: 64
- Passengers: 58
- Crew: 6
- Fatalities: 64
- Survivors: 0

Second aircraft
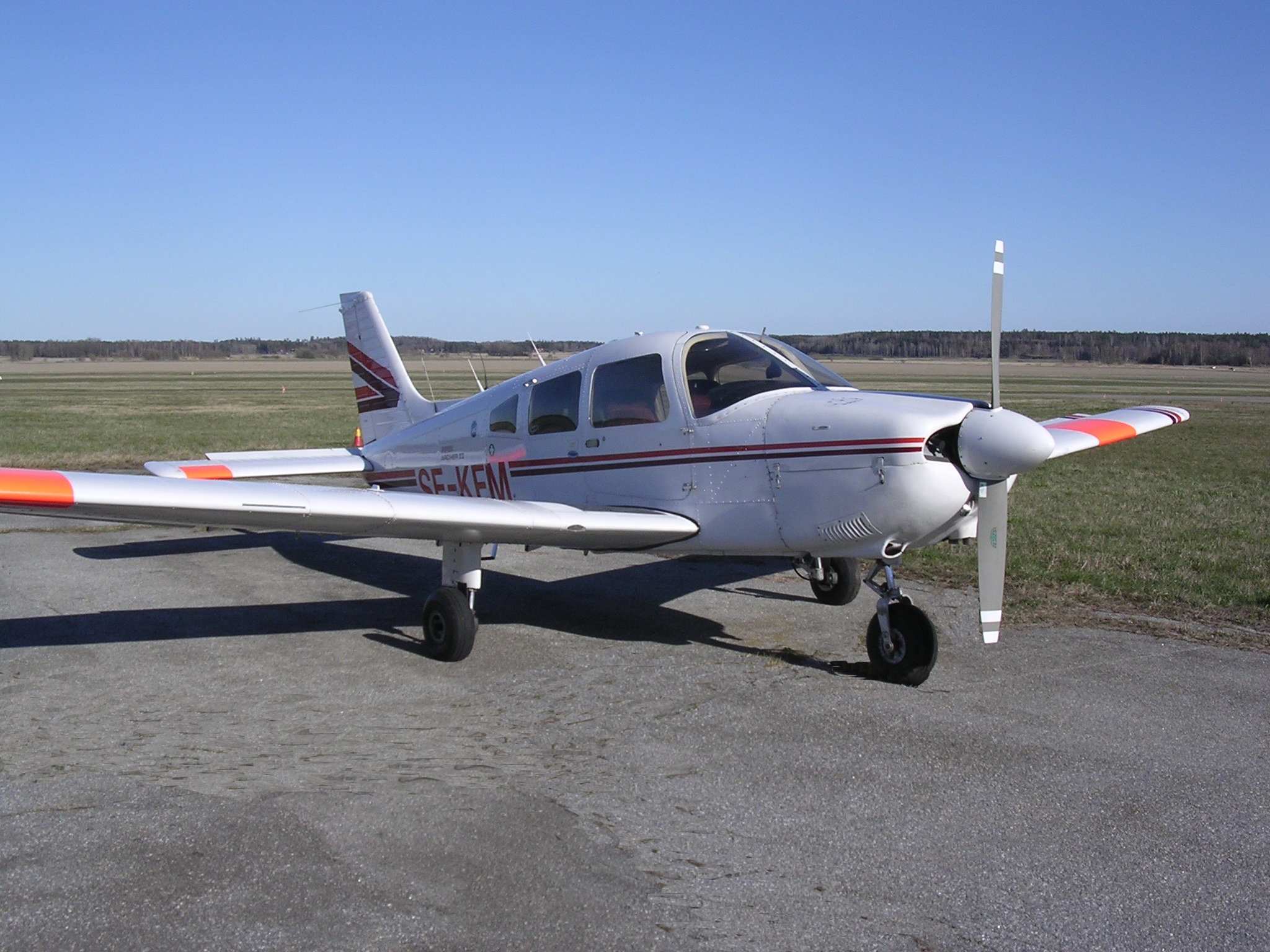
- A Piper PA-28-181 Archer, similar to the one involved in the collision
- Type: Piper PA-28-181 Archer
- Operator: Private
- Registration: N4891F
- Flight origin: Zamperini Field; Torrance, California, U.S.
- Destination: Big Bear City Airport; Big Bear Lake, California, U.S.
- Occupants: 3
- Passengers: 2
- Crew: 1
- Fatalities: 3
- Survivors: 0

Ground casualties
- Ground fatalities: 15
- Ground injuries: 8

Aeroméxico Flight 498 was a scheduled commercial flight from Mexico City, Mexico, to Los Angeles, California, United States, with several intermediate stops. On Sunday, August 31, 1986, the McDonnell Douglas DC-9 operating the flight was clipped in the tail section by a Piper PA-28 Cherokee owned by the Kramer family, and crashed into the Los Angeles suburb of Cerritos, killing all 64 on the DC-9, all 3 in the Piper, and an additional 15 people on the ground. Eight on the ground also sustained minor injuries. Blame was assessed equally on the Federal Aviation Administration (FAA) and the pilot of the Cherokee. No fault was found with the DC-9 or the actions of its crew.

== Background ==
=== Aircraft ===
The larger aircraft involved, a McDonnell Douglas DC-9-32, with tail number XA-JED, named Hermosillo, was delivered in April 1969 to Delta Air Lines as N1277L before entering into service with Aeroméxico in November 1979. It was flying from Mexico City to Los Angeles International Airport (LAX), with intermediate stops in Guadalajara, Loreto, and Tijuana.

N4891F was a privately operated Piper PA-28-181 Archer owned by the Kramer family, which was flying from Torrance to Big Bear City, California. The Piper aircraft was piloted by William Kramer, 53. His wife Kathleen, 51, and daughter Caroline, 26, were also aboard. Their plane had departed Torrance around 11:40 am PDT. Kramer had 231 flight hours of experience and had moved to Southern California within the last year from Spokane, Washington.

The cockpit crew of Flight 498 consisted of Captain Arturo Valdes Prom (46) and First Officer Jose Hector Valencia (26). The captain had 4,632 hours of flying experience in the DC-9 and a total of 10,641 flight hours. The first officer had flown 1,463 hours, of which 1,245 hours had been accumulated in the DC-9.

=== Passengers and crew ===
Nationality	Passengers	Crew	Total
Colombia	1	0	1
El Salvador	1	0	1
Mexico	20	5	25
United States	36	1	37
Total	58	6	64

Thirty-six of the passengers were citizens of the United States. Of the 20 Mexican citizens, 11 lived in the U.S. and 9 lived in Mexico. One Salvadoran citizen lived in Islip, New York. Ten of the passengers were children.

== Accident summary ==
On Sunday, August 31, 1986, around 11:46 am PDT, Flight 498 began its descent into Los Angeles with 58 passengers and 6 crew members on board. At 11:52 am, the Piper collided nearly perpendicular to the upper left side of the horizontal stabilizer support structure of the DC-9, shearing off the top of the Piper's cockpit and decapitating the pilot and both passengers. The heavily damaged Piper descended uncontrollably after the collision, entering a flat spin, and falling onto an empty playground at Cerritos Elementary School.

The DC-9, with its horizontal stabilizer, rudder, and half of its vertical stabilizer torn off, over-banked to the right (rotated clockwise) and simultaneously entered a steep dive. It slammed into a residential neighborhood at Holmes Avenue and Reva Circle in Cerritos, crashing into the back yard of a house at 13426 Ashworth Place, where it exploded on impact. The explosion scattered the DC-9's wreckage across Holmes Avenue and onto Carmenita Road, destroying four other houses and damaging seven more. All 64 passengers and crew on board died (plus 15 people on the ground); a fire added to the damage.

== Investigation and aftermath ==
The U.S. National Transportation Safety Board (NTSB) investigation found that the Piper had entered the Los Angeles Terminal Control Area (TCA) airspace (now Class B Airspace) without the required clearance. The TCA included a triangular slab of airspace from 6,000 to 7,000 feet (1,800 to 2,100 m) of altitude, reaching south to 33.714°N 118.007°W across the Piper's intended flight path. The Piper could legally fly beneath this airspace without contacting air traffic control (ATC), but instead climbed into the TCA. The ATC had been distracted by another unauthorized private flight, a Grumman AA-5B Tiger, entering the TCA directly north of the airfield, which also did not have clearance.

The Piper was not equipped with a mode C transponder, nor was one required, which would have indicated its altitude, and LAX was not equipped with automatic warning systems. Neither pilot appeared to have attempted any evasive maneuvers, because neither pilot sighted the other aircraft, although they were in visual range. When an autopsy revealed significant arterial blockage in Kramer's heart, public speculation arose suggesting that he had experienced a heart attack that incapacitated him and led to the collision, but further forensic evidence discounted the theory and Kramer's error was determined to be the main contributing factor to the collision.

As a result of this accident and other near-midair collisions in TCAs, the FAA required that all large commercial jets in U.S. airspace be equipped with a traffic collision avoidance system and required that light aircraft operating in dense airspaces be equipped with mode C transponders, which can report their altitude.

A jury ruled that the DC-9 bore no fault, instead deciding that Kramer and the FAA each acted equally negligently and bore equal responsibility. Federal Air Regulations 14 CFR 91.113 (b) require pilots of all aircraft to maintain vigilance to "see and avoid" other aircraft that might be on conflicting flight paths.

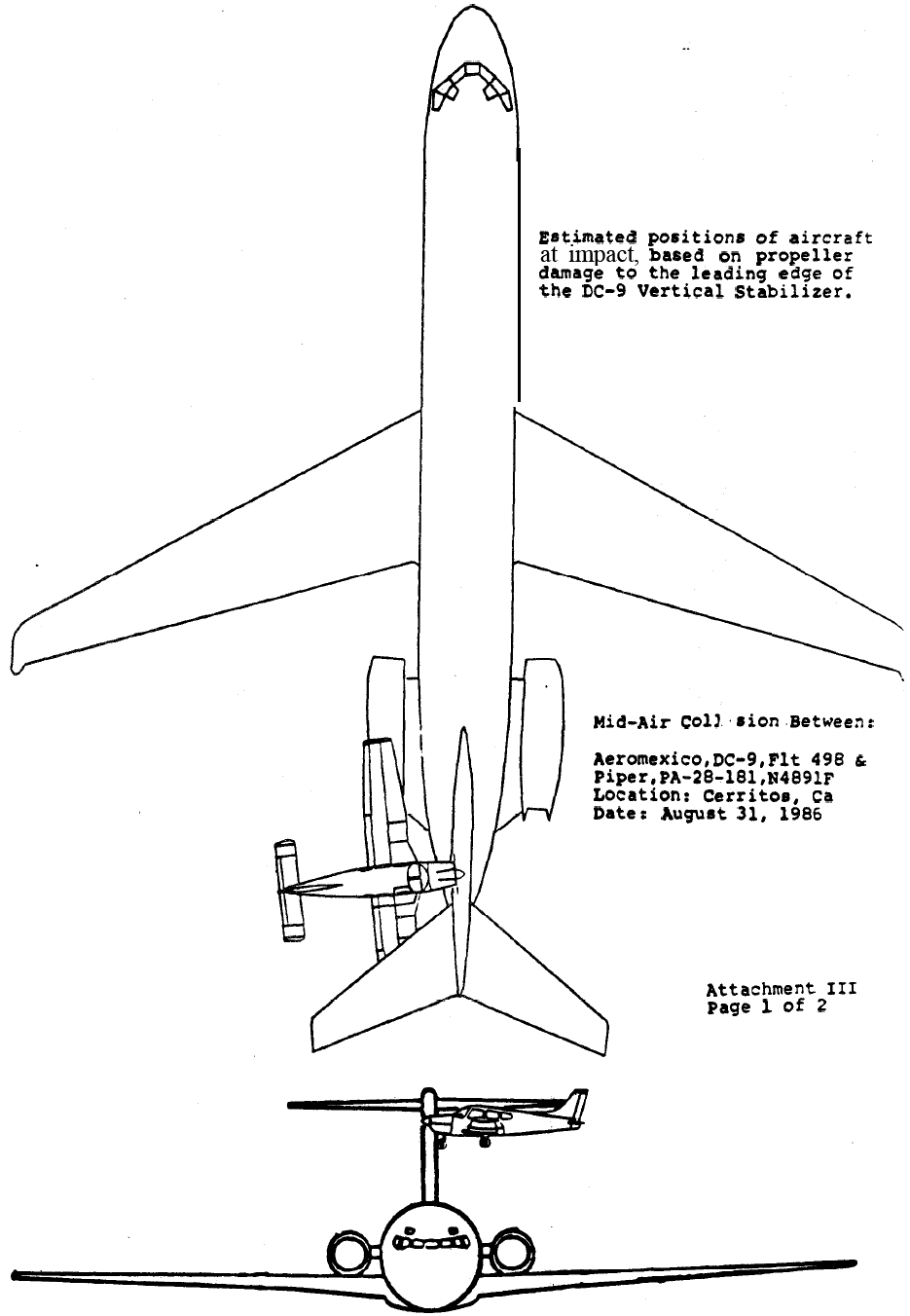
NTSB drawing portraying approximate point of impact

The United States Court of Appeals for the Ninth Circuit applied the Supreme Court of California's ruling in Thing v. La Chusa to extend recovery for negligent infliction of emotional distress to Theresa Estrada, whose husband and two of four children were killed on the ground as the result of the crash. In the television documentary Mayday, Estrada reported that she saw the explosion from a distance; Thing requires that the person be at the scene and aware of the injury being caused to the victim. She arrived minutes later, with her home consumed by fire and surrounded by burning homes, cars, and aircraft debris. In a separate trial on damages, the Estrada family was awarded a total of $868,263 (approximately $1.99 million in 2025) in economic damages and $4.7 million ($10.8 million in 2025) in noneconomic damages, including $1 million ($2.3 million in 2025) for the negligent infliction of emotional distress.

== In popular culture ==
The Discovery Channel Canada/National Geographic television series Mayday featured the accident in a season-four episode titled "Out of Sight". The accident was featured again during season eight in a compilation episode titled "System Breakdown".

A similar accident is depicted in the Breaking Bad episode "ABQ".

It is featured in season one, episode five, of the TV show Why Planes Crash, in an episode called "Collision Course".

In August 2022, KNBC produced The Nightmare of Flight 498, led by reporter Hetty Chang, who had been a seven-year-old child residing in the neighborhood where the DC-9 crashed and a student at the school where the Piper Cherokee crashed[?]. Interspersed with news reports from the crash, Chang interviewed her parents, neighbors (including one who resided at 13426 Ashworth Place where the DC-9 exploded), and first responders about their recollections of the crash.

== Gallery of memorial at the Cerritos Sculpture Garden ==
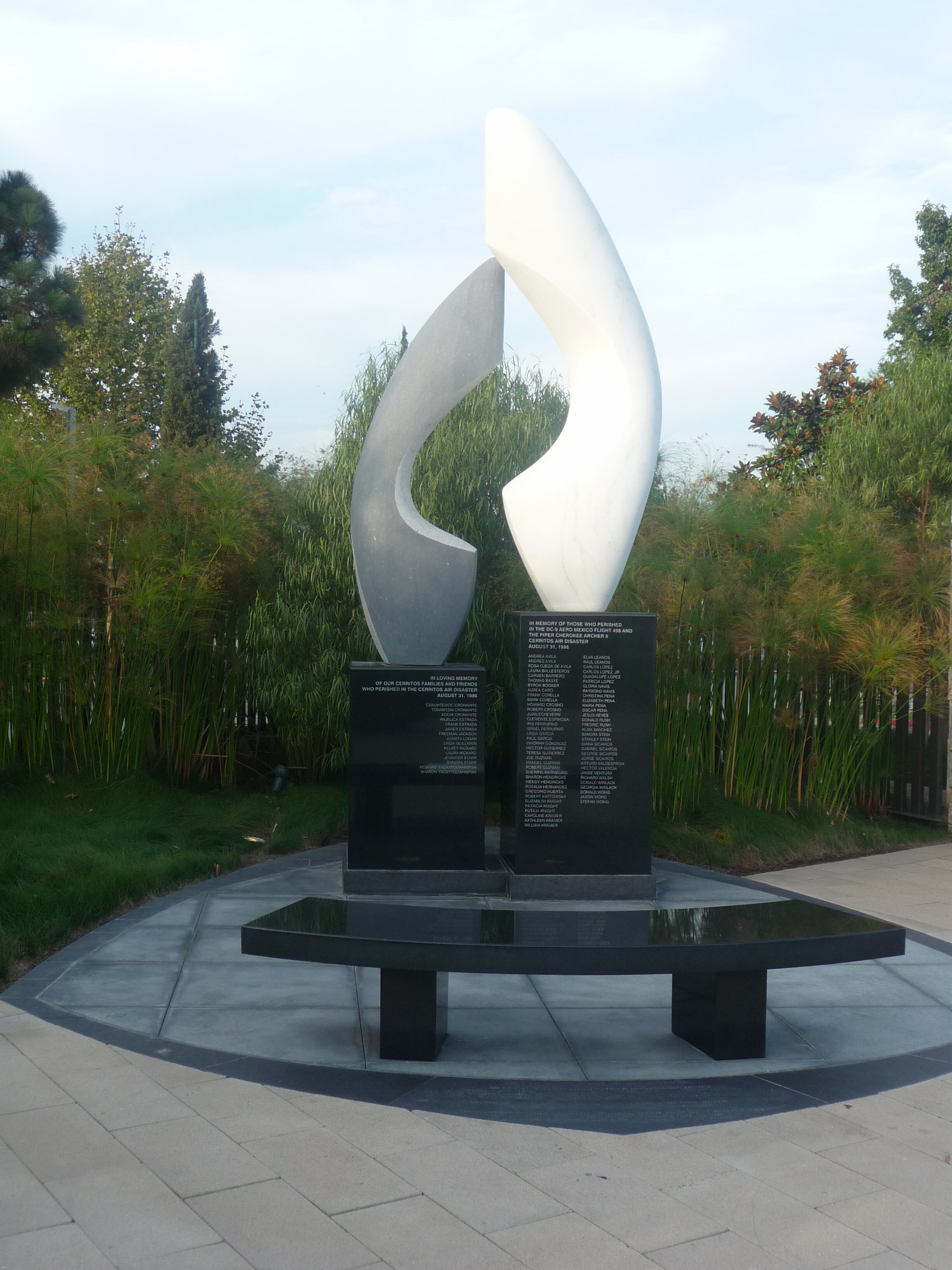
Cerritos Air Disaster Memorial

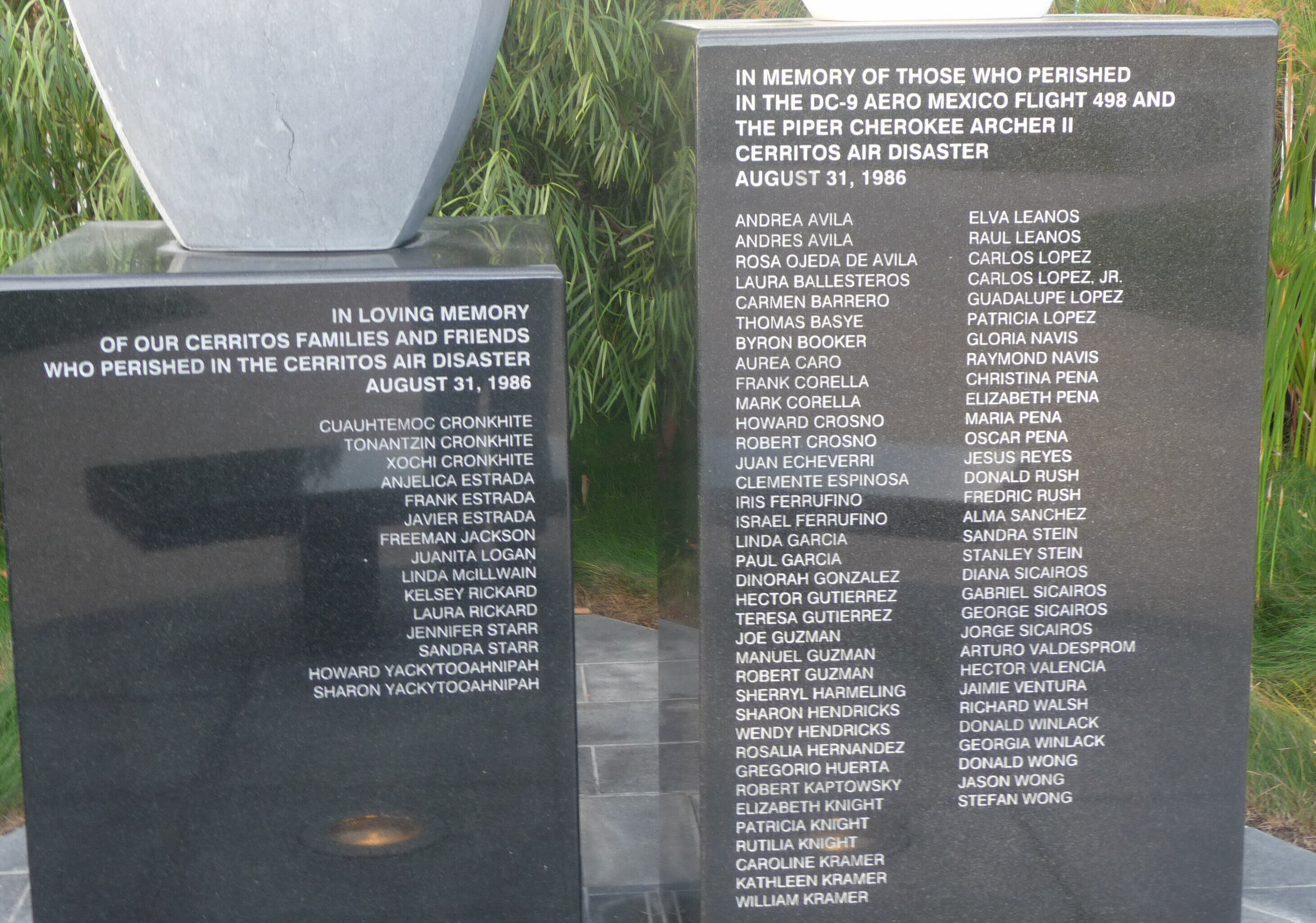
Close-up of the names of the victims

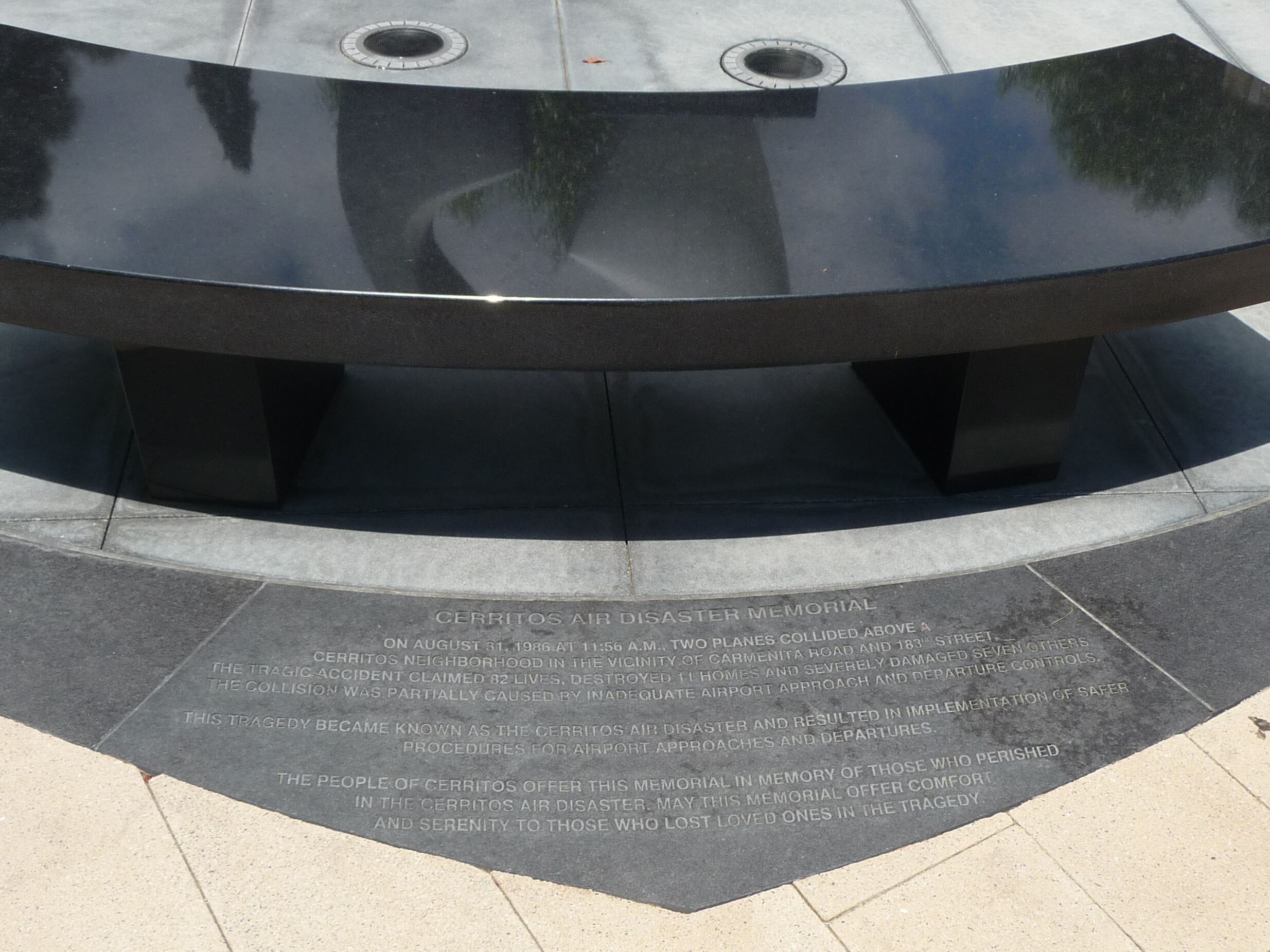
Dedication plaque at the base of the bench

== See also ==
- American Airlines Flight 5342, a similar midair collision near Washington, DC, in 2025.
- Proteus Airlines Flight 706, a similar midair collision between a Beechcraft 1900 and a Cessna 177 Cardinal over Quiberon Bay, Brittany, France, in 1998.
- Pacific Southwest Airlines Flight 182, a similar midair collision between a Boeing 727 and a Cessna 172 in San Diego, California, in 1978.
- Hughes Airwest Flight 706, a similar midair collision between a DC-9 and a McDonnell Douglas F-4 Phantom II over Los Angeles, California, in 1971.
- Allegheny Airlines Flight 853, a similar crash that occurred, also with a DC-9 and Piper Cherokee, in Fairland, Indiana in 1969.
- Piedmont Airlines Flight 22, a similar crash that occurred with a 727 in Hendersonville, North Carolina, in 1967.
- TWA Flight 553, a similar crash that occurred near Urbana, Ohio, and involved a new DC-9 and a small plane, in 1967.
