= Piedmont Airlines Flight 22 =

1967 mid-air collision

Coordinates: 35°20′14″N 82°26′16″W

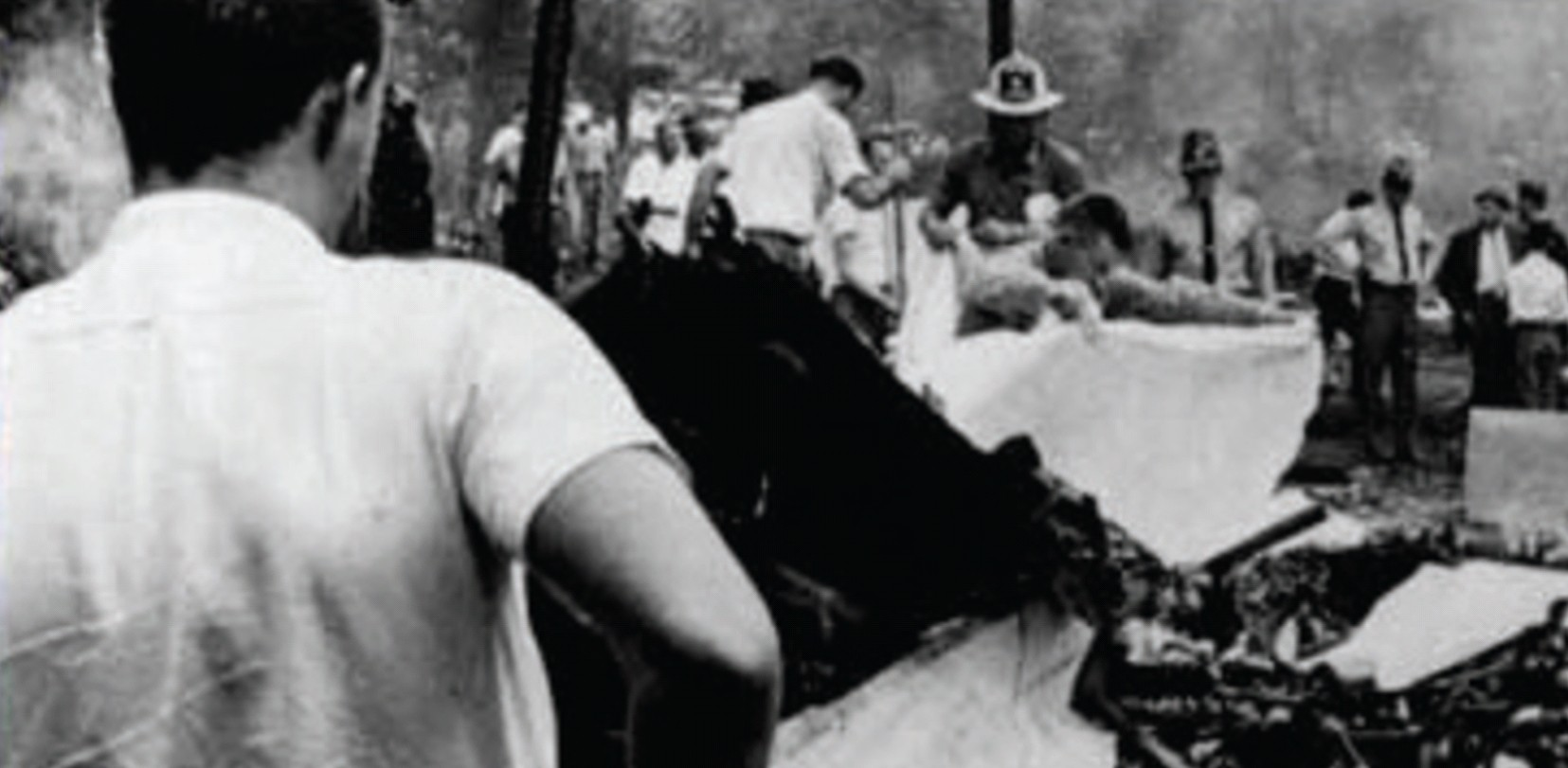
- The crash site of Piedmont Airlines Flight 22

Accident
- Date: July 19, 1967
- Summary: Mid-air collision
- Site: Hendersonville, North Carolina
- Total fatalities: 82
- Total survivors: 0

First aircraft
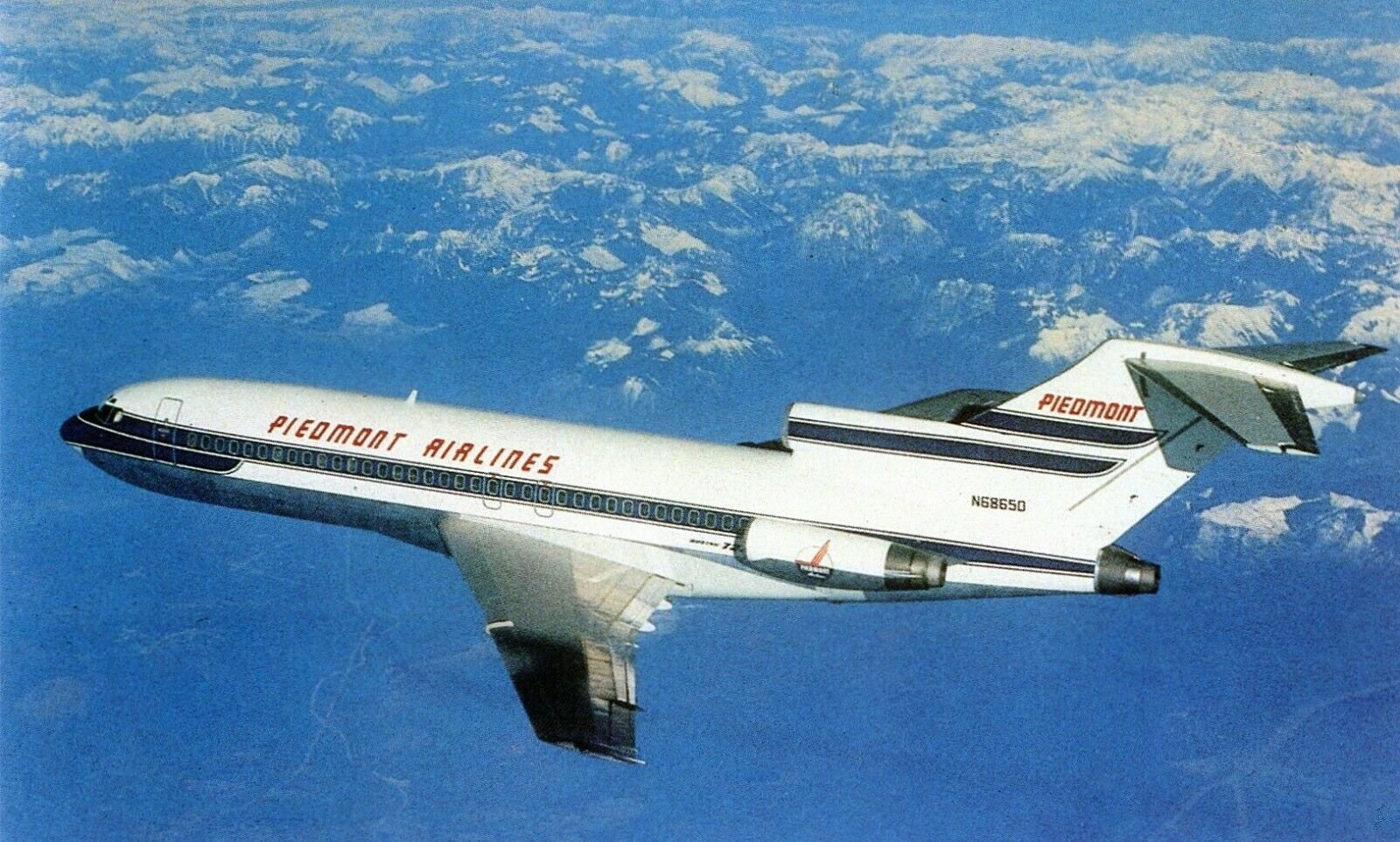
- N68650, the Piedmont Airlines Boeing 727 involved in the accident
- Type: Boeing 727-22
- Name: Manhattan Pacemaker
- Operator: Piedmont Airlines
- IATA flight No.: PI22
- ICAO flight No.: PAI22
- Call sign: PIEDMONT 22
- Registration: N68650
- Flight origin: Asheville Regional Airport; Asheville, North Carolina
- Destination: Roanoke Regional Airport; Roanoke, Virginia
- Occupants: 79
- Passengers: 74
- Crew: 5
- Fatalities: 79
- Survivors: 0

Second aircraft
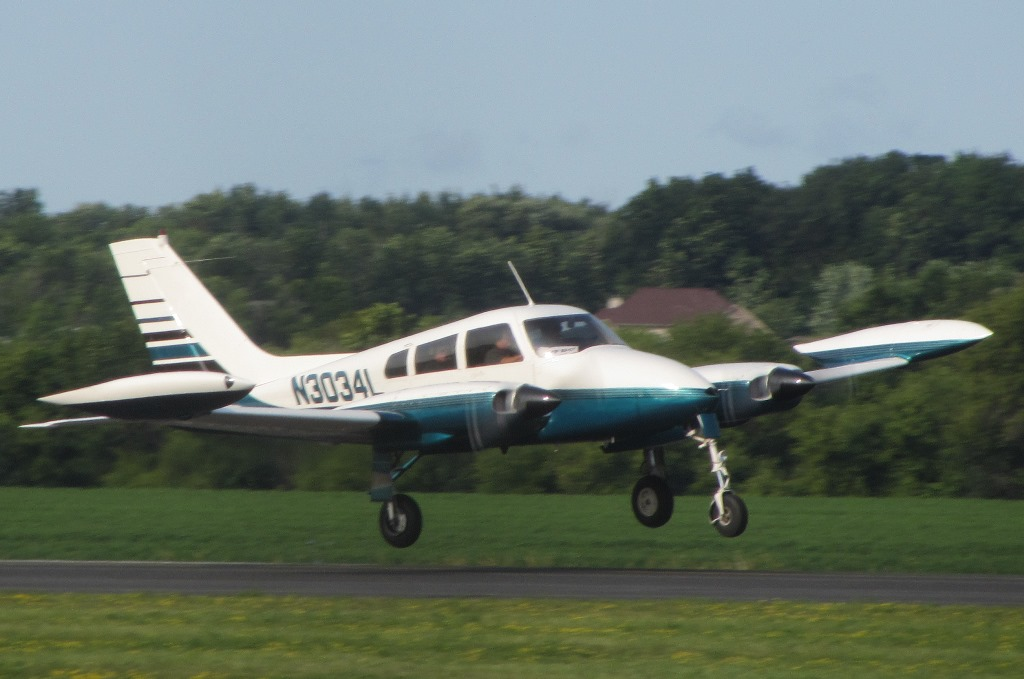
- A Cessna 310 similar to the accident aircraft
- Type: Cessna 310
- Operator: Lanseair Inc.
- Call sign: 21 SIERRA
- Registration: N3121S
- Occupants: 3
- Passengers: 2
- Crew: 1
- Fatalities: 3
- Survivors: 0

Piedmont Airlines Flight 22 was a Piedmont Airlines Boeing 727 that collided with a twin-engine Cessna 310 on July 19, 1967, over Hendersonville, North Carolina, United States. Both aircraft were destroyed and all passengers and crew were killed, including John T. McNaughton, an advisor to U.S. Secretary of Defense Robert McNamara. The aircraft were both operating under instrument flight rules (IFR) and were in radio contact with the Asheville control tower, though on different frequencies. The accident investigation was the first of a major scale conducted by the newly created National Transportation Safety Board. A review of the investigation conducted 39 years after the accident upheld the original findings that had placed primary responsibility on the Cessna pilot.

== Flight and crash ==
Piedmont Flight 22 took off from Asheville Regional Airport's Runway 16 at 11:58 a.m. for a 35-minute IFR flight to Roanoke, Virginia under the command of captain Raymond F. Schulte (49), first officer Thomas C. Conrad (30), and flight engineer Lawrence C. Wilson (37). While the Boeing 727 was still on its takeoff roll, John D. Addison (48), the pilot of the Cessna 310 N3121S, reported: "Two one Sierra just passed over the VOR, we're headed for the ... for .. ah .. Asheville now." The approach controller then cleared the Cessna to descend and maintain 6,000 feet (1,800 m). At 11:59:44, the controller cleared Flight 22 to "... climb unrestricted to the VOR, report passing the VOR" and then cleared the Cessna for an approach to Runway 16. At 12:01, the 727 was still climbing when it collided with the Cessna just aft of the 727's cockpit at an altitude of 6,100 feet (1,900 m), causing its disintegration. Many witnesses reported that the sound of the collision resembled that of a jet breaking the sound barrier. The 727 rolled onto its back and crashed vertically into an area known as Camp Pinewood, exploding on impact.

== Original investigation ==
The accident became the first involving a major airline to be investigated by the National Transportation Safety Board (NTSB), newly formed to replace the Civil Aeronautics Board. The NTSB's report placed the primary responsibility for the accident on the Cessna pilot, while citing air traffic control procedures as a contributing factor, and recommended a review of minimum pilot skill levels required for IFR flight.

== Controversy and new investigation ==
In 2006, 39 years after the accident, the NTSB reopened the investigation to review possible irregularities identified by Paul Houle, a former military traffic-accident investigator and historian who spent several years studying the accident. Houle alleged the following problems with the NTSB's original investigation:

- The original report omitted the fact that the Cessna pilot had properly reported his heading, which should have alerted air traffic control to a potential conflict between the two planes. The report claims that a four-second pause occurred at that point, but the transcript shows no such pause.
- The original report does not mention a fire in a cockpit ashtray aboard the 727 that occupied the attention of the crew for the 35 seconds before the collision, as evidenced by the cockpit voice recorder transcript.
- The lead NTSB investigator had an apparent conflict of interest, as his brother was a vice president and director of Piedmont Airlines, according to court testimony from 1968.

Houle also mentioned that at the time, the newly formed NTSB was not fully independent of the Federal Aviation Administration (FAA), as both reported to the Department of Transportation. Houle claimed that these conflicts of interest led the NTSB to avoid citing either Piedmont or FAA controllers as the primary causes of the accident.

In February 2007, the NTSB reported that it had upheld its original findings, reconfirming the probable cause that it had assessed in 1968. In a letter to Houle, NTSB chairman Mark Rosenker wrote that the board had voted 3–1 that Houle's arguments were unsubstantiated.

== Notable passenger ==
John T. McNaughton, a passenger on Flight 22 who was killed along with his wife and son, had just resigned as Assistant Secretary of Defense for International Security Affairs and had been confirmed by the U.S. Senate to become the next Secretary of the Navy. He was Secretary of Defense Robert McNamara's closest advisor.

== Dramatization ==
It is featured in season 1, episode 5, of the TV show Why Planes Crash, in an episode called "Collision Course".

== Similar incidents ==
- PSA Flight 182, another Boeing 727 that collided with a Cessna 172 and crashed into North Park, San Diego in 1978.
- Aeroméxico Flight 498, a McDonnell Douglas DC-9 that collided with a private aircraft over Cerritos, California on August 31, 1986.
- Allegheny Airlines Flight 853, a McDonnell Douglas DC-9 that collided with a Piper Cherokee in Fairland, Indiana on September 9, 1969.
- Hughes Airwest Flight 706
- United Flight 718
- DHL Flight 611
- Proteus Airlines Flight 706
