= Flight 706 =

Flight 706 may refer to:

- Northwest Orient Airlines Flight 706 (1961, Chicago O'Hare), Lockheed L-188 Electra crashed on take-off — maintenance error
- Hughes Airwest Flight 706 (1971, California), a DC-9 passenger jet collided with F-4 Phantom fighter jet
- British European Airways Flight 706 (1971, Belgium), spun out of control — corrosion caused rear pressure bulkhead failure
- Air Vietnam Flight 706 (1974, South Vietnam), hijacked and crashed
- Proteus Airlines Flight 706 (1998, France), a Beechcraft collided with a Cessna whose transponder was switched off
