= Lake Placid Airport =

- IATA: LKP; ICAO: KLKP; FAA LID: LKP

Summary
- Airport type: Public
- Owner: North Elba Park District
- Serves: Lake Placid, New York
- Elevation AMSL: 1,747 ft (532 m)
- Coordinates: 44°15′52″N 073°57′43″W

Maps
- FAA airport diagram
- Interactive map of Lake Placid Airport

Runways
Direction	Length		Surface
Direction	ft	m	Surface
14/32	4,200	1,280	Asphalt

Statistics (2019)
- Aircraft operations: 12,000
- Based aircraft: 14
- Source: Federal Aviation Administration

Lake Placid Airport (IATA: LKP, ICAO: KLKP, FAA LID: LKP) is a public use airport located one nautical mile (1.85 km) southeast of the central business district of Lake Placid, a village in the Town of North Elba, Essex County, New York, United States. It is owned by the North Elba Park District.

This airport is included in the FAA's National Plan of Integrated Airport Systems for 2019–2023, which categorized it as a general aviation facility. Currently, there is no scheduled air service to this airport, although charter operations are available at the airport. A few miles to the west of Lake Placid toward Saranac Lake is the larger Adirondack Regional Airport.

== Facilities and aircraft ==
Lake Placid Airport covers an area of 35 acres (14 ha) at an elevation of 1,747 feet (532 m) above mean sea level. It has one runway designated 14/32 with an asphalt surface measuring 4,200 by 60 feet (1,280 x 18 m).

For the 12-month period ending July 18, 2019, the airport had 12,000 aircraft operations: 51% local general aviation, 34% itinerant general aviation, 14.5% air taxi, and 0.5% military. At that time there were 14 aircraft based at this airport: 12 single-engine and 2 multi-engine.

== Significant Events ==
On October 1, 2023, aviation safety instructor Richard McSpadden and American football former tight end Russ Francis were flying a Cessna 177 out of Lake Placid Airport when the aircraft "experienced an emergency after takeoff." They attempted to return to the airport, but crashed into a ravine near the airport. Both McSpadden and Francis were killed.

== See also ==
- List of airports in New York
