= Richard McSpadden =

American aircraft pilot and educator (1960–2023)

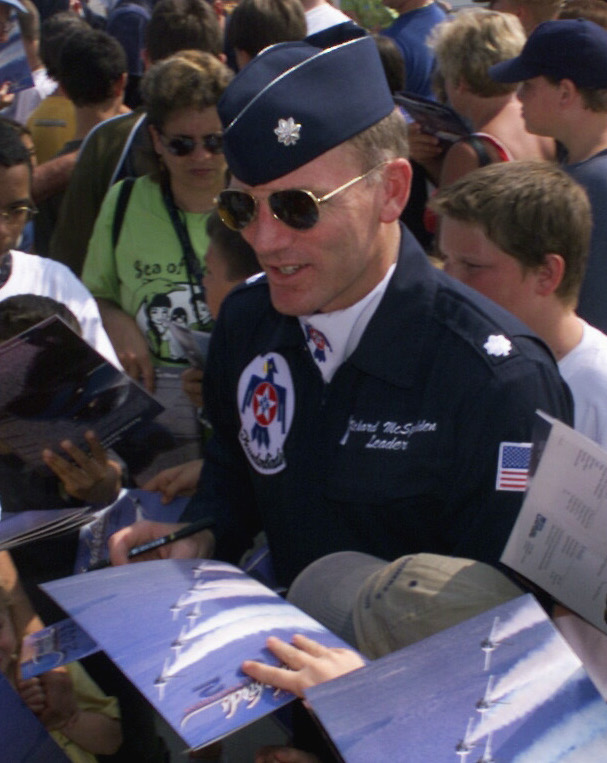
- McSpadden in 2002
- Born: 1960; Panama City, Florida, U.S.
- Died: October 1, 2023 (aged 63); Lake Placid, New York, U.S.
- Education: University of Georgia; Troy University; Air War College
- Occupations: Pilot and educator

Richard Gibson McSpadden (1960 – October 1, 2023) was an American educator and pilot. He became the Aircraft Owners and Pilots Association (AOPA) Air Safety Institute (ASI) senior vice-president in 2020, having previously been its executive director from 2017.

== Early life ==
Richard Gibson McSpadden was born in Panama City, Florida, to Ann and Richard McSpadden, one of their four children.

McSpadden began flying in his teenage years, inspired by his pilot father, and was based out of Air Harbor Airport in Greensboro, North Carolina. The pursuit turned into a career of over 5,000 flying hours. He taught his son to fly and instructed his daughter to fly solo in the family's Piper Super Cub.

He graduated with a degree in economics from the University of Georgia and from Troy University with a master's degree in Public Administration. He also graduated from the U.S. Air Force Air War College.

== Career ==
McSpadden served in the United States Air Force for twenty years, achieving the role of commander and flight leader of its Thunderbirds demonstration team.

He became a commercial pilot and certified flight instructor, with multi-engine land, single-engine seaplane and multi-engine seaplane ratings while also working in information technology.

In 2017, he became executive director of the AOPA's ASI. He was promoted to senior vice-president three years later. He also served as the chairman of the General Aviation Joint Steering Committee. He produced aviation safety material for ASI's YouTube channel and website.

== Personal life ==
McSpadden was married for 31 years to Judy, with whom he had two children.

== Death ==
On October 1, 2023, McSpadden was killed in an aircraft accident in Lake Placid, New York. He was 63. He and former American football player Russ Francis were flying a Cessna 177RG out of Lake Placid Airport when the aircraft's engine partially failed due to undetermined reasons. They attempted to return to the airport but stalled and crashed into a ravine near it. Both McSpadden and Francis were killed. In November 2023, AOPA renamed its annual Air Safety Institute Accident Report from Joseph T. Nall Report to Richard G. McSpadden Report to honor his dedication in improving aviation safety.
