= Aircraft Owners and Pilots Association =

American nonprofit organization

- Abbreviation: AOPA
- Formation: 1939; 87 years ago
- Founders: P.T. Sharples
- Type: Not for profit
- Purpose: Aviation advocacy
- Headquarters: Frederick, Maryland, United States
- Region served: Worldwide
- Members: 384,915 (2012)
- Chairman of the Board: Bill Trimble III (2005)
- Vice Chairman of the Board: Darrell Crate (February 2014)
- Acting Co-Presidents: Jill Baker & Katie Pribyl
- Website: aopa.org

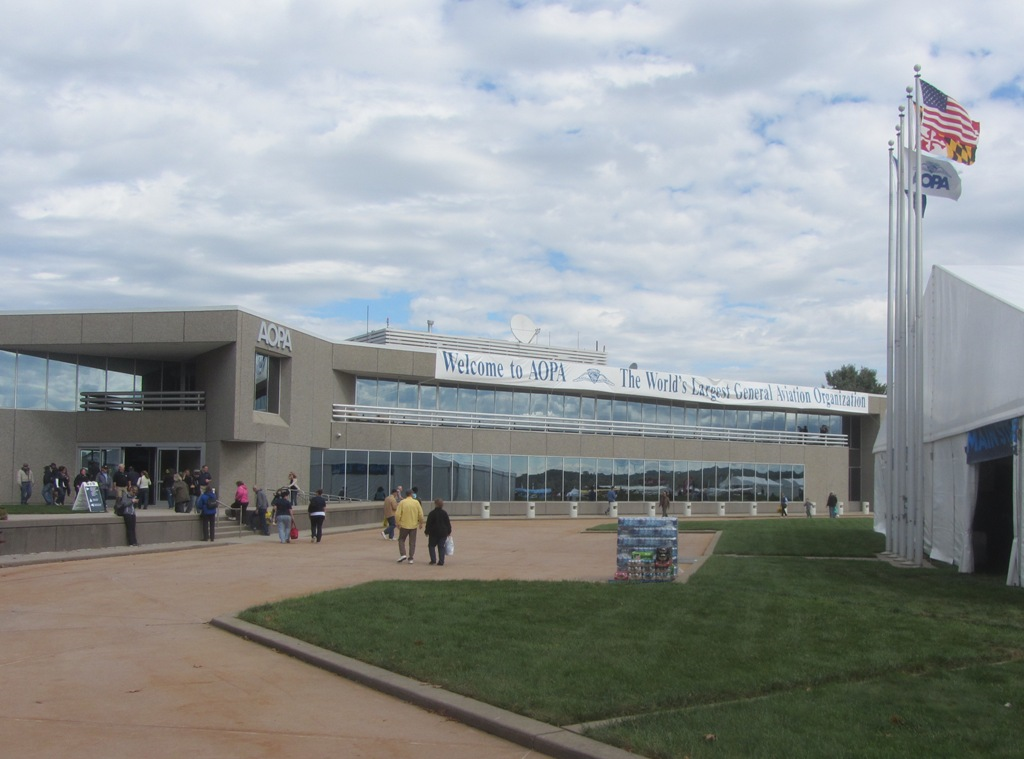
AOPA Headquarters

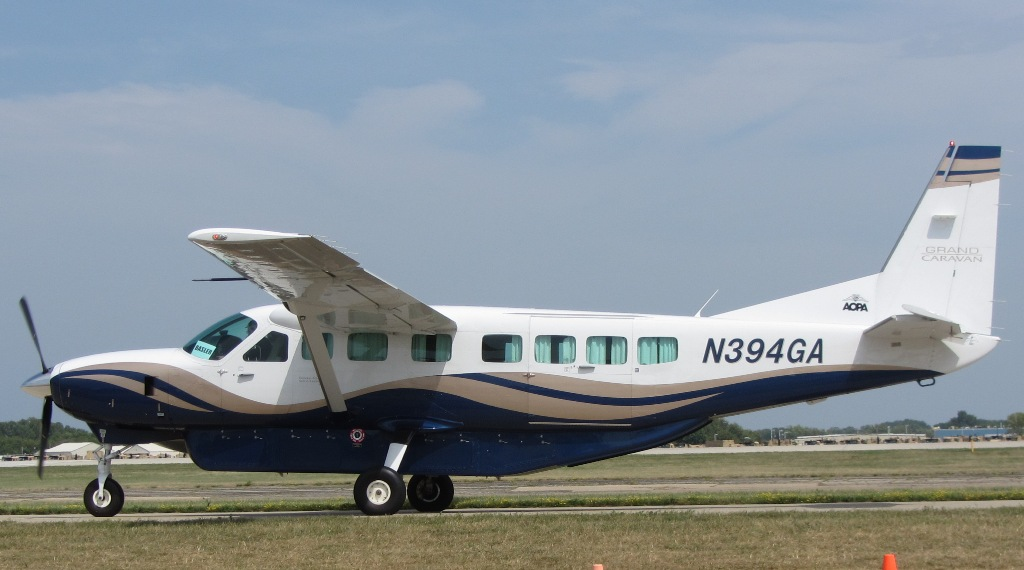
An AOPA-owned Cessna Grand Caravan

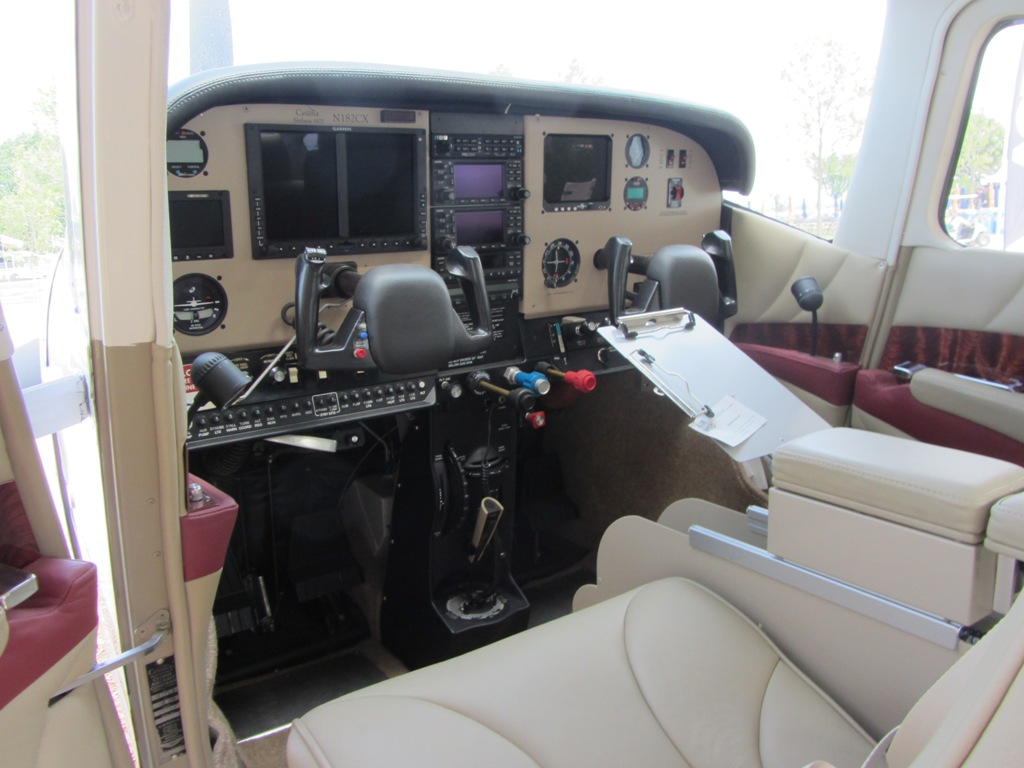
A Cessna 182 panel upgrade featured in AOPA publications for the 2011 sweepstakes

The Aircraft Owners and Pilots Association (AOPA) is a Frederick, Maryland-based American non-profit political organization that advocates for general aviation. AOPA's membership consists mainly of general aviation pilots in the United States. AOPA exists to serve the interests of its members as aircraft owners and pilots and to promote the economy, safety, utility, and popularity of flight in general aviation aircraft.

With 384,915 members in 2012, AOPA is the largest aviation association in the world, although it had decreased in membership from 414,224 in 2010, a loss of 7% in two years. AOPA is affiliated with other similar organizations in other countries through membership in the International Council of Aircraft Owner and Pilot Associations (IAOPA). In 2015, AOPA was inducted into the International Air & Space Hall of Fame at the San Diego Air & Space Museum.

In September 2024, the AOPA appointed Darren Pleasance as its sixth president and CEO. Pleasance, with extensive experience in aviation and business, is set to officially assume the role on January 1, 2025. However, just over a year after taking on the role, Pleasance was removed by the board for unclear reasons.

== History ==
The organization started at Wings Field in Blue Bell, Pennsylvania. On 24 April 1932, The Philadelphia Aviation Country Club was founded at Wings Field. The country club was the location of meetings of members that founded AOPA. AOPA incorporated on May 15, 1939, with Charles Townsend Ludington serving as the first president. In 1971 the organization purchased Airport World Magazine, moving its operations to Bethesda, Maryland.

On 1 October 2023, senior vice president of AOPA Air Safety Institute Richard McSpadden was killed in an aircraft accident near Lake Placid, New York.

In November 2024 Mark Baker, the president and CEO of the AOPA, addressed concerns regarding the negative impact of increased customs fees on businesses in the Bahamas. These fees, which have been imposed on private aircraft flying into the region, have drawn criticism from the AOPA since the summer of 2024. Baker emphasized the potential risks to tourism and local economies, urging policymakers to reconsider the fees to prevent a decline in aviation-driven tourism and business activity in the Bahamas.

== Programs ==
AOPA has several programs.

- AOPA Foundation is AOPA's 501(c)(3) charitable organization. The foundation's four goals are to improve general aviation safety (under the auspices of its Air Safety Institute), grow pilot population, preserve and improve community airports, and provide a positive image of general aviation.
- AOPA Political Action Committee is just for AOPA members. Through lobbying, it represents the interests of general aviation to Congress, the Executive Branch, and state and local governments. The AOPA PAC campaigns in favor of federal, state and local candidates that support their policies and oppose those who do not through advertising and membership grassroots campaigns.
- GA Serves America was created to promote general aviation to the public.
- Legal Services Plan/Pilot Protection Services provides AOPA members with legal defense against alleged FAA enforcement charges as well as assistance obtaining an FAA flight medical. Enrollment in Pilot Protection Services is only open to AOPA members and requires an additional payment above dues. The Legal Services Plan was combined with the former medical program in May 2012 under the name Pilot Protection Services. The Legal Services Plan was created in June 1983.
- Air Safety Institute (formerly the Air Safety Foundation) is a separate nonprofit, tax exempt organization promoting safety and pilot proficiency in general aviation through quality training, education, research, analysis, and the dissemination of information.
- You Can Fly, a program to support flying clubs, encourage best practices in flight training, get lapsed pilots back in the air (Rusty Pilots), bring AOPA's resources and expertise to pilot groups across the country, and help high school students learn more about careers in aviation. All while trying to make flying more accessible and affordable.

== Events ==
AOPA sponsors its own Fly-In and open house in Frederick, Maryland. The yearly event started in 1991 with 125 aircraft. By 2001, the attendance grew to 760 aircraft. The event was cancelled for five years after the September 11, 2001 attacks and consequent airspace changes, but resumed in 2006.

== See also ==
- Canadian Owners and Pilots Association – similar organization established in Canada in 1952
- Experimental Aircraft Association – similar organization focused on homebuilt aircraft
