= Hughes Airwest Flight 706 =

1971 mid-air collision over California

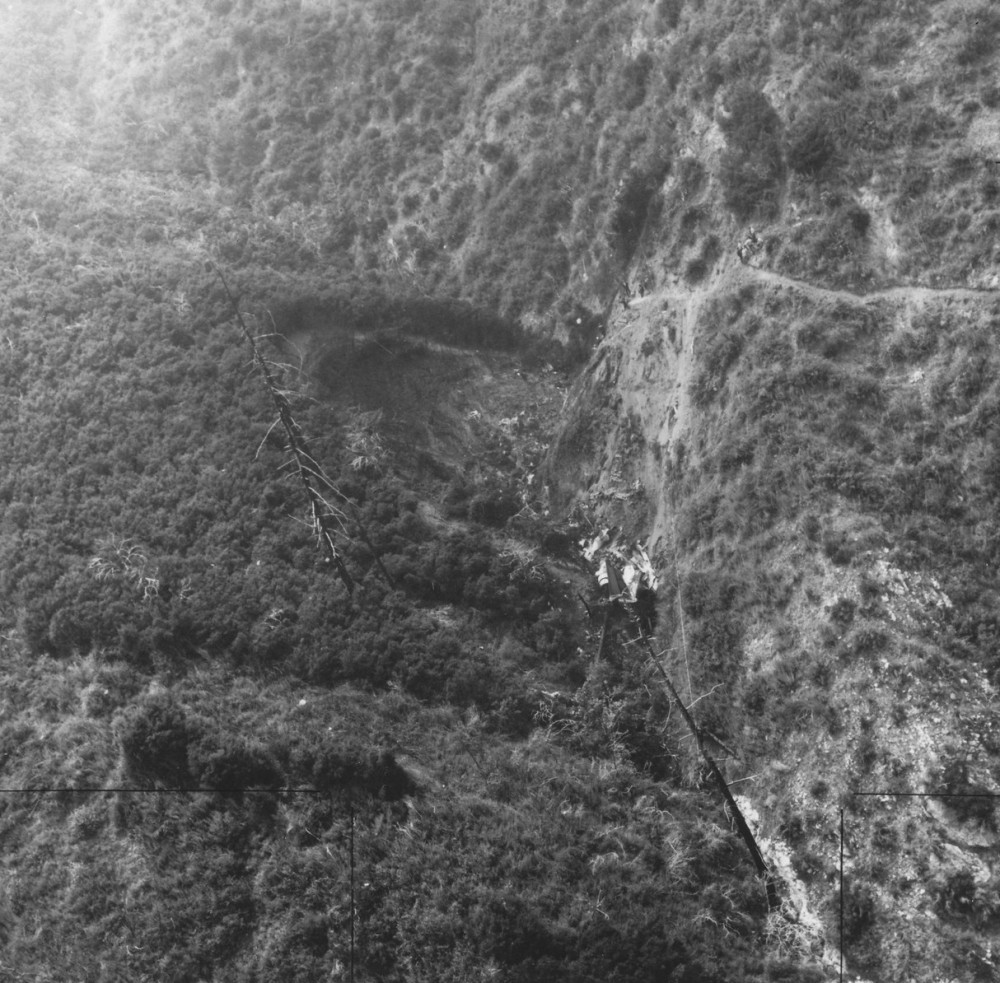
- Wreckage of Flight 706 in the San Gabriel Mountains

Accident
- Date: June 6, 1971
- Summary: Mid-air collision
- Site: San Gabriel Mountains, California, United States; 34.175°N 118.00°W
- Total fatalities: 50
- Total injuries: 1
- Total survivors: 1

First aircraft
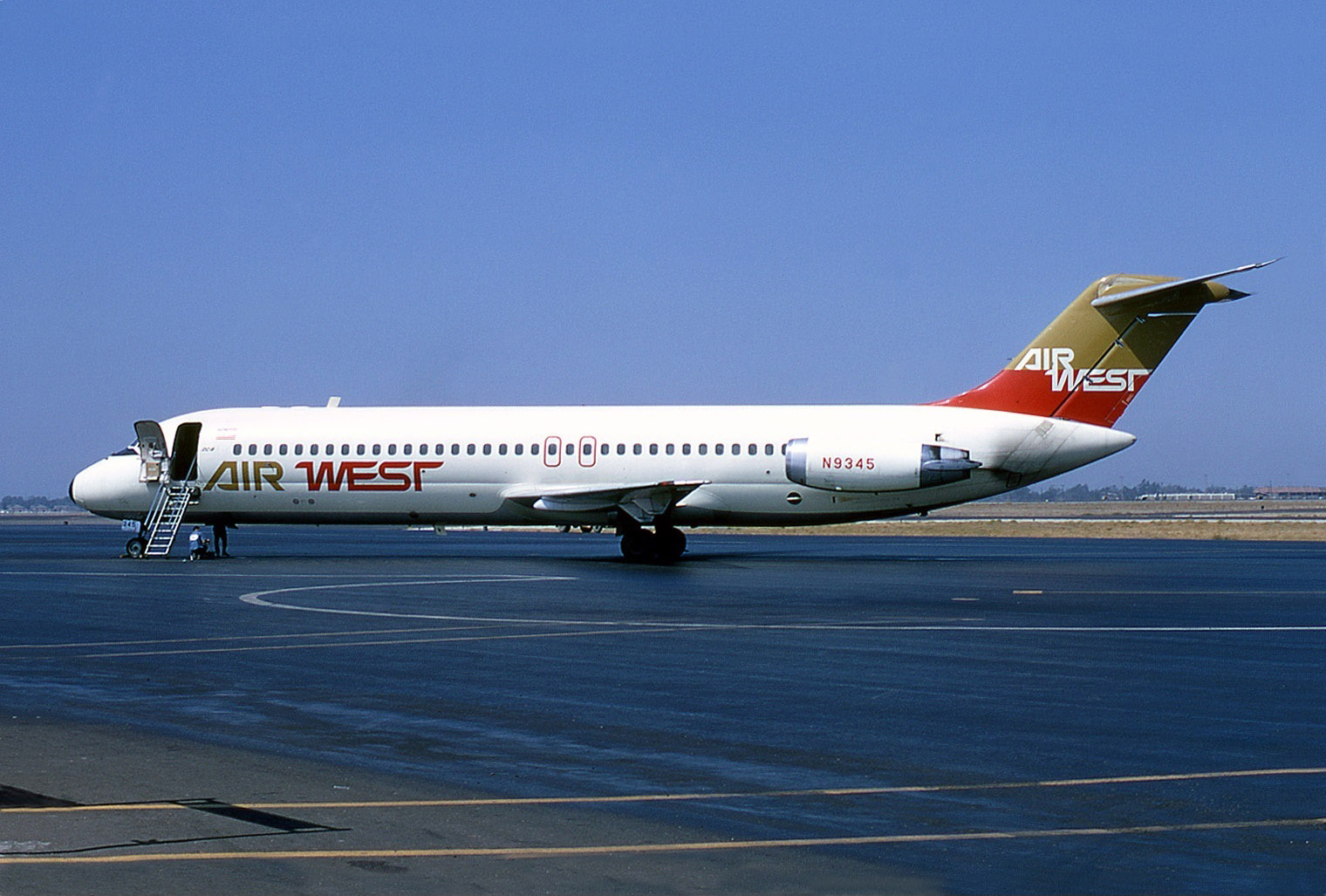
- N9345, the McDonnell Douglas DC-9-31 involved in the collision, seen in 1970
- Type: McDonnell Douglas DC-9-31
- Operator: Hughes Airwest
- IATA flight No.: RW706
- Call sign: AIR WEST 706 RED
- Registration: N9345
- Flight origin: Los Angeles International Airport, California
- 1st stopover: Salt Lake City International Airport, Utah
- 2nd stopover: Boise Airport, Idaho
- 3rd stopover: Lewiston Airport, Idaho
- 4th stopover: Pasco Airport, Washington
- Last stopover: Yakima Airport, Washington
- Destination: Seattle–Tacoma International Airport, Washington
- Occupants: 49
- Passengers: 44
- Crew: 5
- Fatalities: 49
- Survivors: 0

Second aircraft
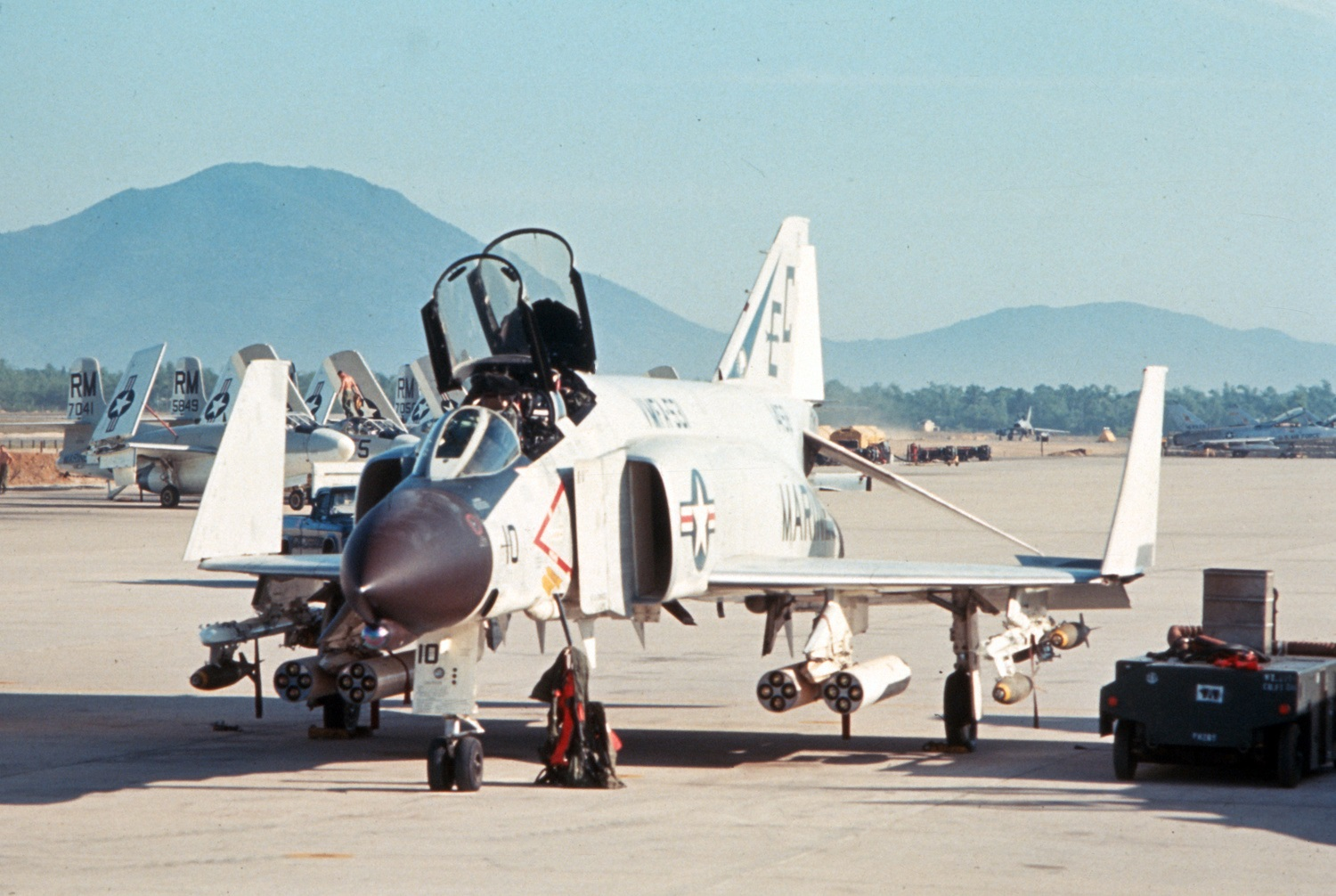
- 151458, the McDonnell F-4B Phantom II involved in the collision, while still in service with a previous squadron in 1965
- Type: McDonnell F-4B Phantom II
- Operator: Marine Fighter Attack Squadron 323, United States Marine Corps
- Registration: 151458
- Occupants: 2
- Fatalities: 1
- Injuries: 1
- Survivors: 1

Hughes Airwest Flight 706 was a regularly scheduled flight operated by American domestic airline Hughes Airwest from Los Angeles, California, to Seattle, Washington, with several intermediate stops. On Sunday, June 6, 1971, the McDonnell Douglas DC-9 serving as Flight 706 departed Los Angeles just after 6 p.m. en route to Seattle as a McDonnell Douglas F-4 Phantom II of the United States Marine Corps was approaching Marine Corps Air Station El Toro near Irvine at the end of a flight from Naval Air Station Fallon in Nevada. The two aircraft collided in midair over the San Gabriel Mountains near Duarte, killing all 49 aboard the DC-9 and the F-4 pilot; the F-4 radar intercept officer ejected and survived.

The crash of Flight 706 prompted the United States Armed Forces to agree to reduce the number of military aircraft operating under visual flight rules in civilian air corridors and to require military aircraft to contact civilian air traffic controllers.

== Flight histories ==
Flight 706 was a scheduled passenger flight from Los Angeles International Airport, California, to Seattle–Tacoma International Airport, Washington. The McDonnell Douglas DC-9-31 aircraft had accumulated more than 5,500 airframe hours since entering service in 1969. It was operating under the livery and name of Air West; the airline had been recently purchased by Howard Hughes and rebranded Hughes Airwest. The aircraft was piloted by Captain Theodore Nicolay, age 50, who had logged about 15,500 hours of total flying time, with more than 2,500 hours in DC-9s. His co-pilot was First Officer Price Bruner, age 49, who had over 17,100 total hours' flying time and almost 300 hours in DC-9s.

Flight 706 departed from Los Angeles at 6:02 pm PDT, bound for Salt Lake City, Utah, the first of the five intermediate stopovers, followed by Boise and Lewiston in Idaho, and Pasco and Yakima in Washington before ending at Seattle. Control of the flight was transferred to Los Angeles Air Route Traffic Control Center at 6:06 pm, four minutes after takeoff, and passed through 12,000 feet (3,700 m) at 6:09 pm and instructed to head 040 (magnetic) until receiving the Daggett VOR, then direct. Flight 706's acknowledgement of this instruction was the last radio transmission received from the aircraft.

The U.S. Marine Corps McDonnell F-4B-18-MC Phantom II, Bureau Number (BuNo) 151458, coded '458', had been in operation since April 15, 1964. At the time of the accident, it was assigned to Marine Fighter Attack Squadron 323, Marine Aircraft Group 11, 3rd Marine Air Wing, though it had been operated by various squadrons prior to that. The fighter plane was piloted by First Lieutenant James R. Phillips, age 27. The radar intercept officer was 1st Lt. Christopher E. Schiess, age 24. Between them, the crew had more than 1,000 total flight hours. The jet and its crew were based at MCAS El Toro in Orange County, near Irvine.

'458' was part of a cross-country flight of two aircraft when its radio failed while landing at Mountain Home Air Force Base in southwest Idaho. According to routine orders, the aircraft was to effect repairs at Mountain Home AFB and then return to MCAS El Toro. Diagnostic tests at Mountain Home revealed the aircraft had an inoperative radio, an inoperative transponder, oxygen system leak, and a degraded radar system. Maintenance personnel were able to fix the radio and confirm the oxygen leak, but the base did not have the necessary personnel to repair either the transponder or the radar.

Despite the inoperative transponder, Phillips received permission from his superiors to fly the F-4B anyway. As the fighter proceeded to NAS Fallon in Nevada, the oxygen leak deteriorated until the system was disabled completely, and the pilot was instructed to fly at low altitude. The Phantom II departed NAS Fallon at 5:16 pm following a flight plan routing across the Fresno, Bakersfield, and Los Angeles air corridors.

Flight 706 was operating under instrument flight rules (IFR). Under IFR procedures, the pilot guides the aircraft using the cockpit's instrument panel for navigation, in addition to radioed guidance from air traffic controllers and ground radar. BuNo 151458 was operating under visual flight rules (VFR). At the time of the accident, VFR required pilots to "see and avoid" other aircraft, a doctrine that dates back to early aviation. The "see and avoid" rule requires pilots of all aircraft flying in VMC to maintain vigilance for other aircraft flying in their vicinity, in addition to traffic advisories from ATC.

== Collision ==
Near the Bakersfield Flight Service Station, the crew of '458' decided to deviate east from their flight plan to avoid heavy air traffic in the Los Angeles area. Phillips was forced to climb to 15,500 feet (4,700 m) from 1,000 feet (300 m) because of deteriorating weather conditions. Meanwhile, shortly after takeoff, Flight 706 received two radar traffic advisories, neither of which indicated the presence of '458'. Soon after reaching 15,500 feet (4,700 m), the fighter's DME (radio) showed MCAS El Toro was 50 nautical miles (93 km; 58 mi) away. The pilot of '458' then performed an aileron roll, a flight maneuver that rolled the aircraft 360° to allow the pilot to observe any air traffic above or below the aircraft. Schiess, the radar intercept officer, was operating the fighter's radar, which was unable to detect any aircraft due to its deteriorated condition. Because of the stowed position of the scope, he had been leaning forward and looking downward at the instrument. Between three and ten seconds prior to the collision, he glanced up, suddenly observed the DC-9 in his peripheral vision and shouted a warning to the pilot. The pilot attempted an evasive roll, but was unable to clear the oncoming airliner.

Around 6:11 pm, Flight 706 and '458' collided at about 15,150 feet (4,620 m) altitude, over the San Gabriel Mountains in the vicinity of Duarte. The collision tore the F-4's tail off, and the DC-9's cockpit was similarly ripped off as a result. The stricken airliner "cartwheeled" through the air and plunged downwards. Witnesses in nearby Duarte described hearing a loud noise and seeing two flaming objects falling from the sky. A second explosion shook the area as the DC-9 struck the mountain. Schiess ejected from the F-4B and parachuted to safety; Phillips, the pilot, could not eject and was killed in the crash. The F-4B crashed on Mount Bliss, about one mile (1.6 km) from the airliner wreckage. Burning debris from the collision and subsequent crashes set off numerous small brush fires in the area. Wreckage was scattered across a mile of nearly inaccessible terrain in the Angeles National Forest.

== Investigation ==
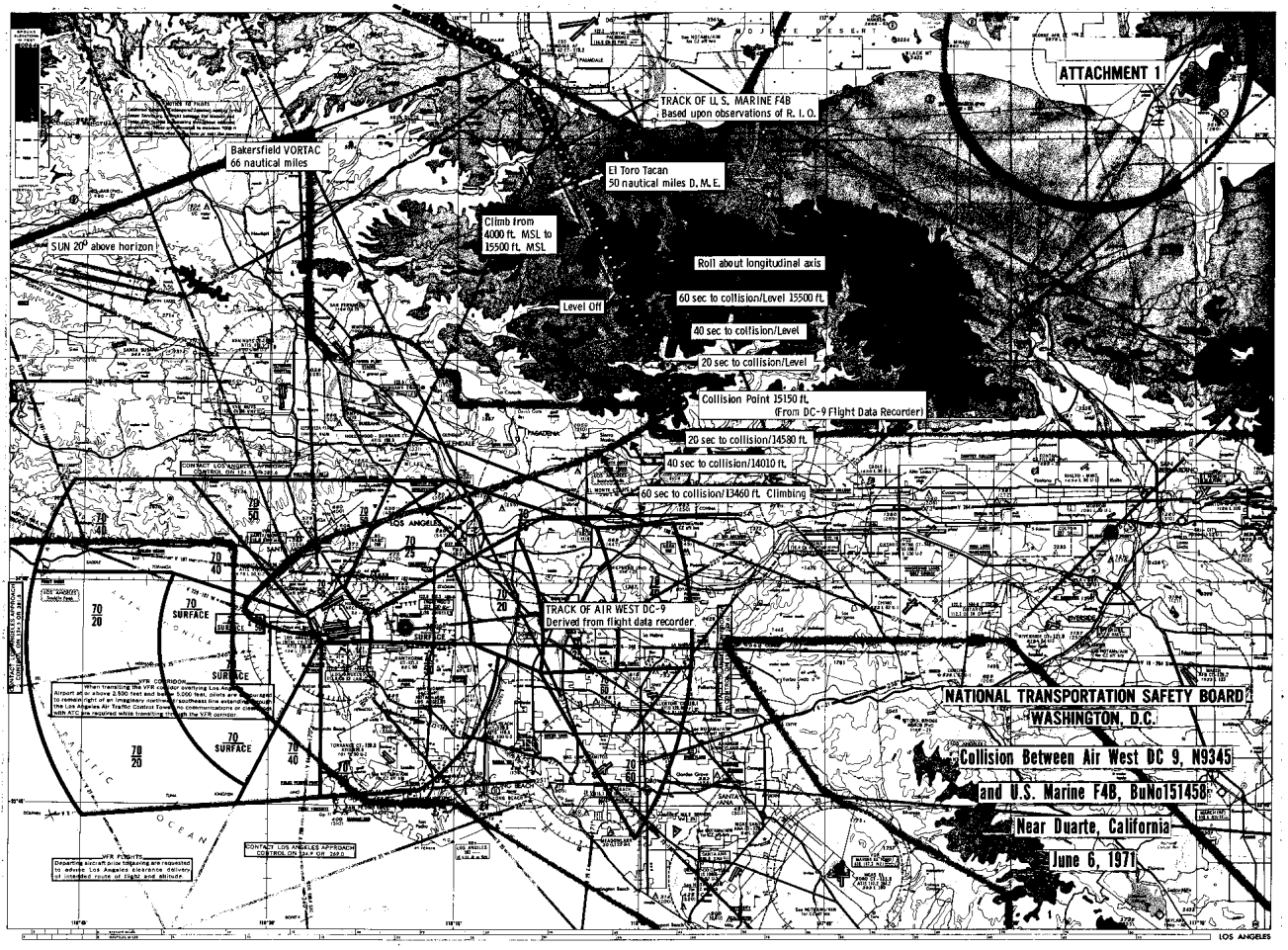
Collision area. Source: NTSB accident report.

The stricken airliner crashed onto Mount Bliss in the San Gabriel Mountains at an elevation approximately around the 3,000 feet (900 m) level, where the bulk of the wreckage landed in a gorge. Fire department officials sent search and rescue helicopters to the crash site, but efforts were hampered by thick fog. Nine bodies were initially found at the crash site, some of them intact and still strapped into their seats. News reports indicated where these bodies had apparently been thrown clear on impact, and had come to rest alongside the tail section of the aircraft.

Some eyewitnesses reported the F-4B's right wing struck the center of the airliner's fuselage immediately after performing a barrel roll. Other witnesses claimed that the F-4B ripped a large hole in the fuselage of the DC-9, through which papers and luggage streamed as the crippled airliner fell. Though papers with the words "Air West" and the date of June 6 were collected by Sheriff's deputies, no luggage was ever recovered.

The National Transportation Safety Board (NTSB) investigated the incident, assisted by the United States Marine Corps, Federal Aviation Administration (FAA), Hughes Airwest, and the Airline Pilots Association. Early statements released by the NTSB revealed the F-4B fighter had attempted to swerve away from the DC-9 immediately prior to impact, and that an additional ten feet (3 m) of clearance would have averted the collision. The NTSB confirmed the fighter had impacted the DC-9 in two places, with its right wing impacting the airliner's forward passenger cabin and the vertical stabilizer "slicing through" the cockpit.

The DC-9 carried a primitive flight data recorder that recorded basic information about the aircraft's air speed, acceleration, heading, and altitude on metal foil tapes. The aircraft was equipped with a simple cockpit voice recorder that recorded all conversations that took place in the cockpit of the aircraft. The flight recorder was recovered by investigators on Thursday, June 10 and sent to Washington, DC, for analysis. The voice recorder was also recovered, but the thermal protective measures had failed and the recording tapes were destroyed by fire.

=== Survivability ===
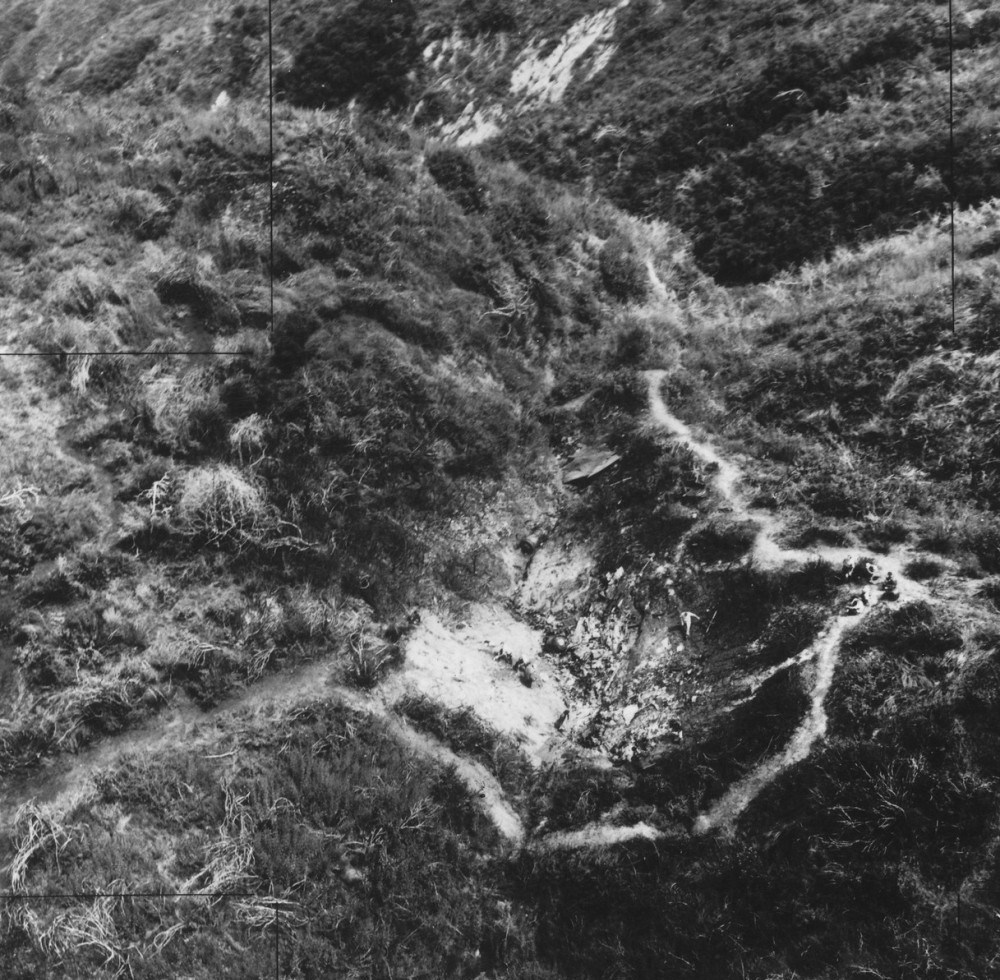
The wreckage of the F-4 at its crash site

The NTSB determined it would have been impossible for any passenger aboard the Hughes Airwest DC-9 to survive the collision, disintegration, and crash of the aircraft. Though a severe ground fire ravaged both crash sites, the NTSB determined that all of the victims had died in the crash itself.

It was further determined that both crewmembers aboard the Marine F-4B could have survived the collision. The investigation by the NTSB revealed a design flaw in the ejector seat and canopy assemblies of the fighter plane whereby the pilot would probably not be able to eject if the radar intercept officer ejected first. Since the ejector seats installed in the F-4B were not intended to be fired through the aircraft's canopy, a circuit breaker kept the seat from ejecting if the canopy was in place. Once the canopy was manually unlocked, the ejector seat circuit was completed and could be fired. This design of ejector seat had a tendency of being unable to complete the circuit in the pilot's ejector seat if the aft ejector seat was fired first. The F-4B aircraft were in the process of being modified with a newly designed canopy when the collision occurred. Aircraft based at MCAS El Toro were slated to begin upgrades in July 1971; at the time of the collision, '458' was still operating with the original canopy configuration, and the pilot was unable to eject from the aircraft.

=== Probable cause and recommendations ===
The NTSB released its final accident report on August 30, 1972. The report concluded:

The National Transportation Safety Board determines that the probable cause of this accident was the failure of both crews to see and avoid each other, but recognizes that they had only marginal capability to detect, assess, and avoid the collision. Other causal factors include a very high closure rate, commingling of IFR and VFR traffic in an area where the limitation of the ATC system precludes effective separation of such traffic, and failure of the crew of BuNo458 to request radar advisory service, particularly considering the fact they had an inoperable transponder.

— National Transportation Safety Board, Aircraft Accident Report, Hughes Air West DC-9, N9345, and U.S. Marine Corps F-4B, 151458, Near Duarte, California, June 6, 1971, August 30, 1972, p. 27.

During the course of the accident investigation, the NTSB attempted to recreate the conditions of the accident to determine the visibility of BuNo458 on June 6. It also calculated that the two airplanes' closing rate was about 1,000 ft/s (300 m/s), similar to the muzzle velocity of a .45 caliber bullet. The NTSB, Federal Aviation Administration (FAA) and the Marine Corps flew a series of F-4B fighters along the flight paths described by Schiess, the radar intercept officer, and various witnesses. While the tests were sufficient to determine the difficulty in locating and identifying the fighter on the radar scope, the many other variables involved in the June 6 incident, including the deteriorated condition of '458', compromised the validity of the study. This inability to ascertain the exact actions and circumstances of the air traffic controllers led the NTSB to recommend where the FAA should install both video and audio surveillance in all air traffic control areas.

The NTSB report included a total of five recommendations for the FAA. These recommendations included: installing recorders for radar displays, installing audio conversation recorders at air traffic control facilities; establishing climb and descent corridors under ATC positive control in the vicinity of air terminals; and establishing more definitive procedures for receiving and handling the emergency transponder code 7700. Additionally, the NTSB strongly recommended that the FAA and the Department of Defense cooperate to develop a program, in areas where a large intermix of civil and military traffic exists, to ensure that appropriate graphical depictions of airspace utilization and typical flow patterns are prominently displayed at all airports and operational bases for the benefit of all airspace users.

The NTSB also recommended the Department of Defense restrict high-speed, low-altitude aircraft operation in civilian air corridors, consider collision avoidance technologies on military aircraft, and make military pilots aware of the FAA's radar advisory service.

== Victims ==
Prominent members of the Utah business community were passengers on the flight returning from a deep sea fishing trip to Mexico, including nine members of The Fishy Trout and Drinking Society. American political philosopher Arnold Kaufman was among the victims.

== Aftermath ==
Congressmen Sherman P. Lloyd (R-Utah) and Henry S. Reuss (D-Wis) both decried the actions of the Marine Corps jet fighter, which media at the time indicated had been "stunting" prior to the collision. In actuality, the 360° aileron roll maneuver the fighter pilot executed was to observe any air traffic above or below the aircraft. Lloyd said that military aircraft should be required to establish contact with air traffic controllers when entering high-traffic air corridors and around airports, while Reuss advocated the complete ban of military aircraft from any high-traffic civilian air corridors. Senator Frank Moss (D-UT) sponsored a bill in December 1971 that would have required the installation of anti-collision gear on all aircraft by 1975.

VFR and the "see and avoid" doctrine faced sharp criticism in the press. Oscar M. Laurel, a member of the National Transportation Safety Board (NTSB) team investigating the crash, was widely quoted saying that now "may be a good time to take another look" at VFR flights near metropolitan areas.

The validity of the "see and avoid" doctrine as a safe means of aircraft navigation was a point of contention between the NTSB and the Federal Aviation Administration (FAA). The NTSB had specifically faulted the deficiencies and failures in the FAA doctrine in several earlier collisions, including the 1969 collision of Allegheny Airlines Flight 853 with a privately owned Piper PA-28 and the 1967 collision of Piedmont Airlines Flight 22 with a privately owned Cessna 310. The FAA rebutted these findings and insisted that, regardless of the mode of operation, it is the duty of the aircraft pilot to be aware of any aircraft in his immediate vicinity.

In March 1971, the NTSB released a report summarizing the findings of a study of midair collisions. The report indicated that 204 of 396 fatalities in U.S. jetliner crashes since 1967 had occurred in mid-air collisions. Additionally, near-miss situations involving jetliners occurred on average at least once per day, with the Los Angeles and New York areas noted as being especially high-risk. Finally, the report noted that the current trend in air casualties indicated that a further 528 people would die in mid-air collisions during the following ten years. These figures did not include the casualties from Flight 706.

An FAA study in 1968 had found that a quarter of the 2,230 near-miss aircraft encounters reported that year had involved a military aircraft. Following the in-flight collision of Flight 706, the FAA and the US military agreed to cut down on VFR flights and operate instead under IFR. This transition would require military aircraft to file flight plans and obey civilian air traffic controllers.

On June 21, 1971, 15 days after the collision, the Airline Pilots Association and Professional Air Traffic Controllers Organization issued a joint statement, asking the FAA for a series of safety regulations that included a speed limit of 250 knots (290 mph; 460 km/h) for aircraft operating under VFR. Other demands included the installation of transponders in all aircraft to amplify aircraft's presence on radar screens, and the re-evaluation of VFR due to the increased complexity, congestion, and speed of modern air travel.

The New York Times reported that the incidence of deaths in commercial aviation accidents had risen sharply in 1971, up from 146 deaths in 1970 and 158 deaths in 1969. Additionally, these deaths had occurred at a time when airlines were cutting back flights due to the economic recession, and airlines had flown about 6% fewer hours in 1971 than 1970. The eight fatal accidents of 1971 included three mid-air collisions and four landing approach crashes; one of these collisions, All Nippon Airways Flight 58, which also involved a military aircraft, became the deadliest air disaster worldwide at the time it took place with 162 deaths. 1971 also saw the crash of Alaska Airlines Flight 1866, at the time the worst single plane crash in US civil aviation history.

Later that year, Hughes Airwest changed its livery to its signature all-yellow.

=== Litigation ===
A week after the crash, the families of various passengers aboard Flight 706 began filing lawsuits and court papers against Hughes Airwest and, later, against the government of the United States. The first filing was by the family of Keith A. Gabel, which filed a motion to perpetuate testimony in the Central District of California on June 16, 1971. A motion to perpetuate testimony requests that the court issue a court order for a person's deposition to be taken, and can be done prior to a lawsuit being filed under the Federal Rules of Civil Procedure.

Lawsuits against the United States government were delayed six months by the Federal Tort Claims Act. In January 1972, the Gabel family filed a lawsuit against the United States that contained class-action allegations and sought a "declaratory judgment on the issue of liability". The Judicial Panel on Multidistrict Litigation decided to move all related court actions to the Central District of California. Eleven actions were transferred in July 1972. The US District Court ordered the transfer of all 72 actions filed in other district courts to be transferred to the jurisdiction of the Central District on March 19, 1973.

On August 30, 1972, all the cases were consolidated into a single case to determine liability. The cases against the United States, Hughes Airwest, and Hughes Air Corporation were consolidated into a single class-action lawsuit in October 1972. On April 5, 1973, Hughes Airwest and the US government agreed not to contest the issue of liability. Most claimants settled by December 1973 for payments of various negotiated amounts.

== Dramatization ==
The story of the accident was featured on the thirteenth season of the Canadian TV series Mayday (known as Air Emergency and Air Disasters in the US, Mayday in Ireland and Air Crash Investigation in the UK and the rest of world) in an episode entitled "Speed Trap".

== See also ==
- List of accidents and incidents involving airliners in the United States
- 2025 Potomac River mid-air collision, a mid-air collision that happen due to an overreliance of the "see and avoid" principle alongside similar human visual limitations.

Other mid-air collisions attributed to failure to follow the "see and avoid" principle

- Aeroméxico Flight 498, 1986
- Allegheny Airlines Flight 853, 1969
- Piedmont Airlines Flight 22, 1967
- TWA Flight 553, 1967
- Capital Airlines Flight 300, 1958
- Proteus Airlines Flight 706, 1998 crash involving a Beech 1900D with the same flight number
