= Cessna 177 Cardinal =

American light aircraft

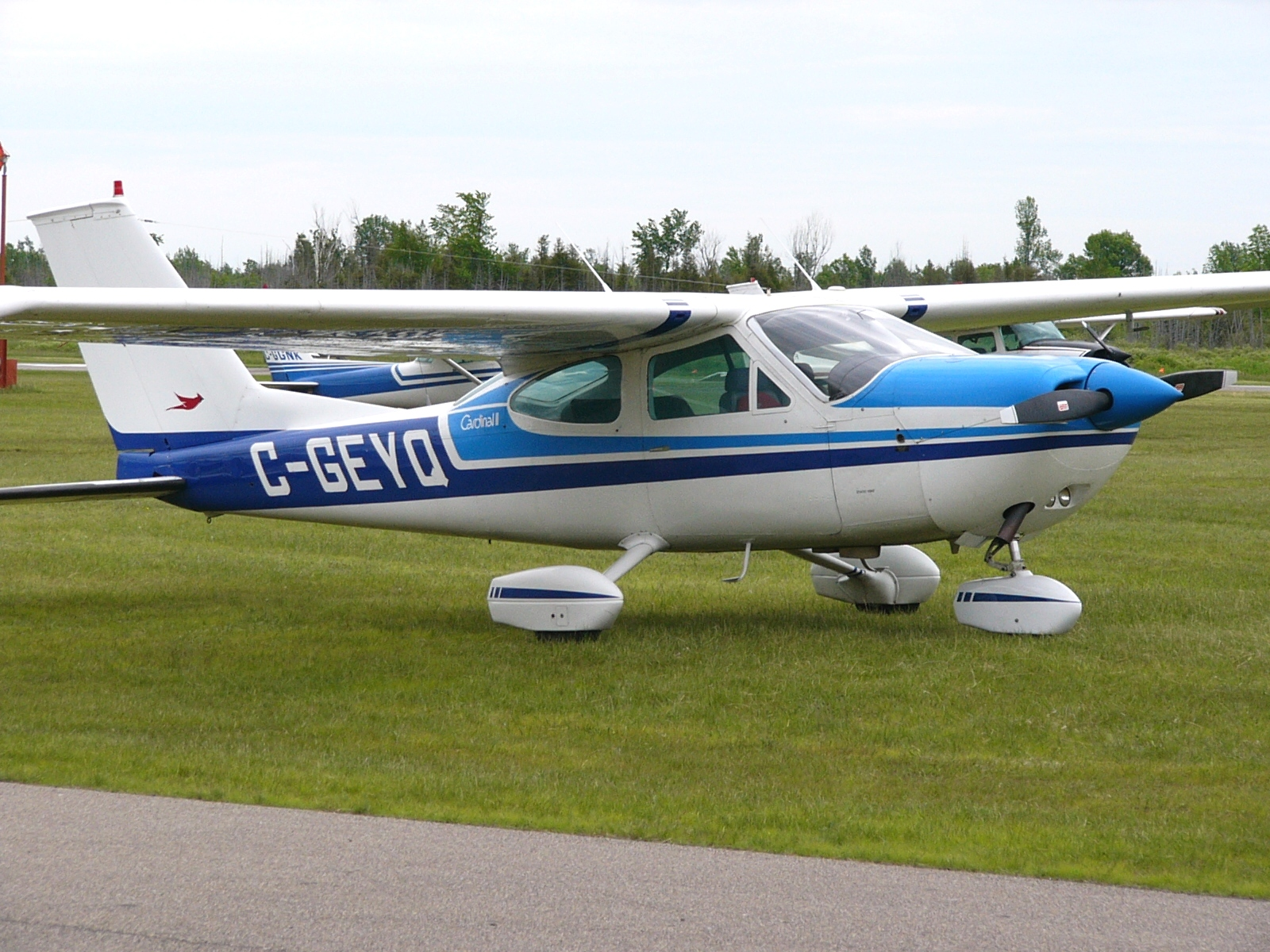
- Cessna 177B Cardinal

General information
- Type: Light utility aircraft
- Manufacturer: Cessna Aircraft Company
- Number built: 4,295

History
- Manufactured: 1968–1978
- Introduction date: 1968
- First flight: July 15, 1966

The Cessna 177 Cardinal is a light single-engine, high-wing general aviation aircraft produced by Cessna. It was intended to replace the Cessna 172 Skyhawk. First announced in 1967, it was produced from 1968 to 1978.

== Development ==
The Cessna 177 (originally Model 341) was designed in the mid-1960s when the engineers at Cessna were asked to create a "futuristic 1970s successor to the Cessna 172". The resulting aircraft featured newer technology such as a cantilever wing lacking the lift struts of previous models, and a new laminar flow airfoil. The 177 is the only production high-wing single-engined Cessna since the Cessna 190 & 195 series to have both fixed landing gear and a cantilever wing without strut bracing.

Cardinal logo seen on many 177s and 177RGs

The 1968 model 177 was introduced in late 1967 with a 150 hp (112 kW) engine. A deluxe model known as the "Cardinal" was also introduced that year with many otherwise optional interior/avionics upgrades installed as standard.

One of the design goals of this 172 replacement was to allow the pilot an unobstructed view when making a turn. In the 172 the pilot sits under the wing and when the wing is lowered to begin a turn that wing blocks the pilot's view of where the turn will lead to. The engineers resolved this problem by placing the pilot forward of the wing's leading edge, but that led to a too-far-forward center of gravity.

This problem was partially counteracted by the decision to use the significantly lighter Lycoming O-320 four-cylinder engine in place of the six-cylinder O-300 Continental used on the 172. The forward CG situation still existed even with the lighter engine, so a stabilator was chosen, to provide sufficient elevator control authority at low airspeeds.

The 177 design was intended to be a replacement for the 172, which was to be discontinued after introduction of the new aircraft. The new design was originally to be called the 172J (to follow the 1968 model 172I). However, as the time came to make the transition, there was considerable resistance to the replacement of the 172 from the company's Marketing Division. The 1969 172 jumped to the designator 172K—there is no 172J.

The 177 offers much better upward visibility than a 172 because of its steeply raked windshield and more aft-mounted wing. The absence of an obstructing wing support strut also makes the aircraft an excellent platform for aerial photography.

=== Performance and handling problems ===
Soon after delivery of the first Cardinals to customers there were reported incidents of pilot-induced oscillation (PIO) that alarmed Cessna enough that the factory initiated a priority program to eliminate the problem. Reviewer Joe Christy explains:

We liked that airplane, and found almost nothing to pick at. However, owners soon discovered to their horror that it didn't fly or land exactly like a strutless Skyhawk, and some heavy-handed Super-Car drivers managed to smash the Cardinal tail into the pavement on landing, knock-off a few nose-wheels, etc. (apparently, this was possible if one closed his eyes, used full back-pressure on the wheel at the flare and then sat rigidly waiting for the crashing noises to subside). Cessna accepted the blame gracefully. That was proper because, after all, they had lulled a generation of Cessna pilots into near-effortless flying with the extremely forgiving 172 series, and it probably wasn't ethical to suddenly offer, to many of those same customers, a Cessna that didn't handle exactly like a Cessna. The company therefore picked up the tab for a list of modifications that gentled the Cardinal and returned the smiles to the faces of dealers and customers.

The solution, which was provided at no cost to all aircraft already delivered, was known as Operation "Cardinal Rule" and included a series of 23 inspection, installation, and modification instructions. This Service Letter, SE68-14, consisted of modifying the stabilator to install slots just behind the leading edge (to delay the onset of stabilator stall) and installing full counterbalance (11 pounds versus the original 7 pounds) on the stabilator to eliminate the PIO problem.

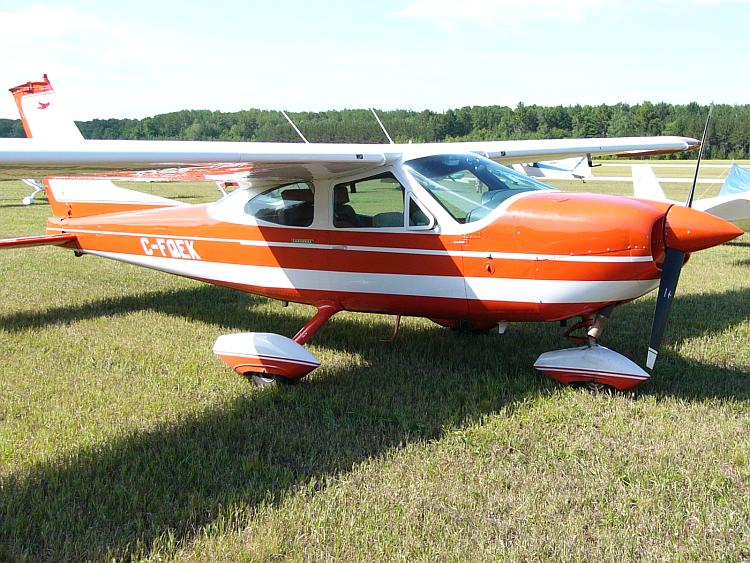
An original 1968 model fixed pitch 150 hp Cessna 177 Cardinal

The 177, with its 150 hp (112 kW) powerplant, was considered "underpowered", even though it had more power than the 145 hp (108 kW) Cessna 172.

=== Cessna 177A ===
Recognizing that the aircraft was underpowered, Cessna introduced the 177A in 1969. The revision featured a 180 hp (135 kW) four-cylinder Lycoming O-360, moving the design's price and role somewhere between that of the 172 and 182. The additional power improved cruise speed by 11 knots (20 km/h).

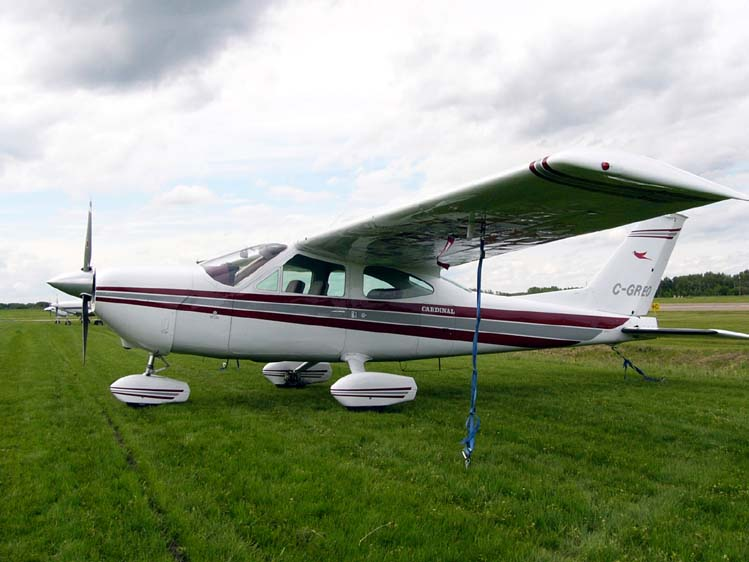
Cessna 177B Cardinal

=== Cessna 177B ===
1970 saw the introduction of the 177B, which had a new wing airfoil, a constant-speed propeller, and other minor improvements. When empty, the 177B weighed 145 lb (66 kg) more than the earlier 177, with its maximum takeoff weight increased from 2,350 lb (1,067 kg) to 2,500 lb (1,135 kg).

In 1978, Cessna built a deluxe version of the 177B, the Cardinal Classic, with leather upholstery, a table for the rear passengers, and a 28-Volt electrical system.

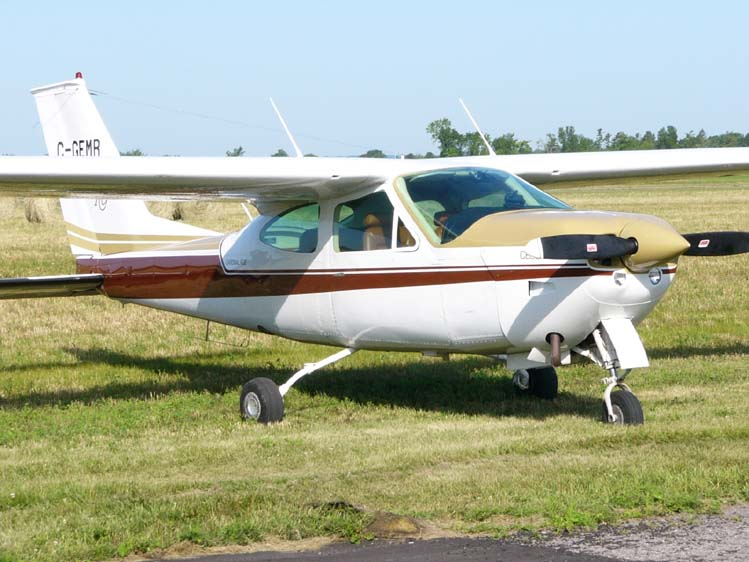
Cessna 177RG Cardinal

=== Cessna 177RG ===
The final aircraft in the 177 line was the retractable-gear 177RG Cardinal RG (originally Model 1008), which Cessna began producing in 1970. Both the nose-wheel and main wheels retract rearwards, with the nose-wheel enclosed by doors when retracted.

To offset the 145 lb (66 kg) increase in empty weight, much of which was from the electrically powered hydraulic gear mechanism, the 177RG had a 200 hp (149 kW) Lycoming IO-360 engine. This also allowed increase of the maximum weight by 300 lbs.

The additional power and cleaner lines of the 177RG resulted in a cruise speed of 148 kn (170 mph; 274 km/h), 22 kn (25 mph; 41 km/h) faster than the 177B. 1,543 177RGs were delivered between the US and Reims Aviation, Cessna's licensed partner in France. The Cardinal RG II was introduced in 1975 with a preferred options package. Those built in France by Reims were referred to as the Reims F177RG (originally Model F1008).

=== Cessna 1023 ===
In 1971, Cessna experimented with a "Quiet Cardinal" similar to the Beechcraft QU-22 Pave Eagle. Designated Model 1023, a single 177B was modified with a 185 hp (138 kW) Wankel engine with a large three bladed 100 inch diameter propeller with a belt driven gear reduction unit and a fuselage-length exhaust canted upward.

== Notable accidents and incidents ==
- On 23 October 1968, Alben Truitt, the grandson of former U.S. Vice President Alben Barkley, hijacked a Cessna 177 from Key West to Cuba. He returned via Canada in February 1969, the hijacker was caught and arrested by police, and was then sentenced to 20 years for aircraft piracy and 20 years for kidnapping (to run consecutively). He was sentenced to a grand total of 40 years in jail.
- On 11 April 1996, a Cessna 177B carrying 7-year-old Jessica Dubroff, her certified flight instructor, and Jessica's father Lloyd Dubroff, crashed after takeoff from Cheyenne Airport in Cheyenne, Wyoming, killing all on board. Dubroff was attempting to set a cross-country record for young pilots, although her instructor was thought to have been at the controls at the time of the accident. No defect in the aircraft itself was found. The accident resulted in general public concern and new Federal legislation banning record attempts by non-holders of private pilot or higher certificates.
- On 30 July 1998, a Cessna 177RG Cardinal collided with Proteus Airlines Flight 706, a Beechcraft 1900D which deviated over Quiberon Bay from its planned approach to Lorient, France, to give its passengers and crew a better view of the ocean liner SS Norway. Both aircraft crashed into the bay, killing all 14 people on board the Beechcraft and the sole occupant of the Cessna 177RG.
- On 14 March 2003, a Cessna 177 Cardinal crashed into Old Fort Mountain near Old Fort, North Carolina, after taking off from Asheville Regional Airport in Asheville, North Carolina. The crash killed author Amanda Davis, who was on a book tour promoting her first novel Wonder When You'll Miss Me, and her parents.
- On October 1, 2023, a Cessna 177RG Cardinal crashed after losing power on takeoff from Lake Placid Airport, and failed to return to the runway, killing pilot Russ Francis, a former NFL tight end who recently purchased the Lake Placid Airways scenic tour business at the airport, and Aircraft Owners and Pilots Association’s Senior Vice President Richard McSpadden, who was widely regarded as an expert on making the so-called "impossible turn" that likely preceded the fatal crash. Lake Placid Airport is noted for being surrounded by the high peaks of the Adirondacks, making a risky 180 degree turn an unfortunate necessity in such situations.

== Specifications (Cessna 177B) ==
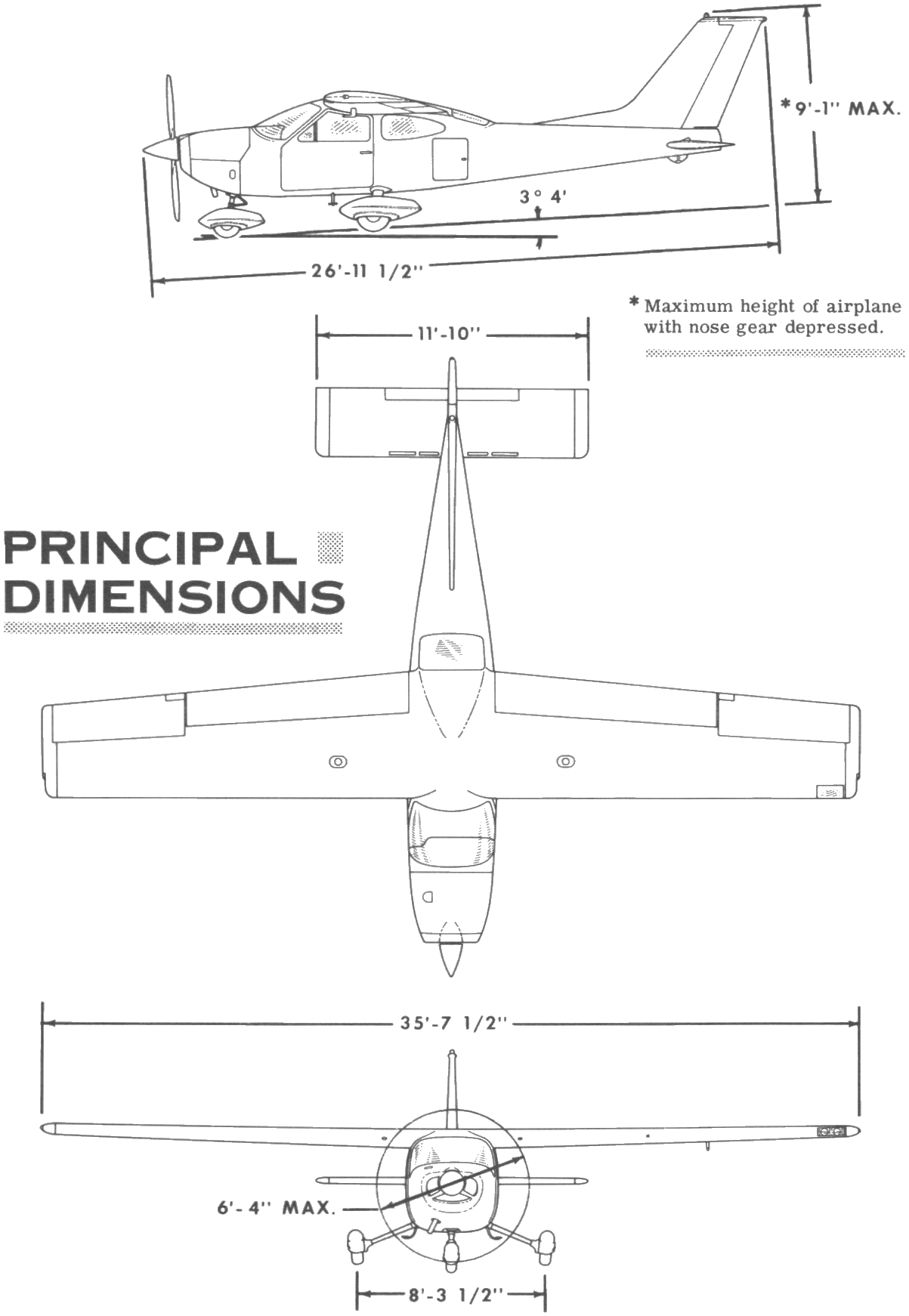
3-view line drawing of the Cessna 177 Cardinal

Data from Airliners.net

General characteristics

- Crew: 1
- Capacity: 3 passengers
- Length: 27 ft 8 in (8.43 m)
- Wingspan: 35 ft 6 in (10.82 m)
- Height: 8 ft 7 in (2.62 m)
- Wing area: 174 sq ft (16.2 m^{2})
- Empty weight: 1,495 lb (678 kg)
- Max takeoff weight: 2,500 lb (1,134 kg)
- Powerplant: 1 × Lycoming O-360-A1F6D air-cooled flat-4 engine, 180 hp (130 kW)

Performance

- Maximum speed: 136 kn (157 mph, 252 km/h)
- Cruise speed: 124 kn (143 mph, 230 km/h)
- Range: 604 nmi (695 mi, 1,119 km)
- Service ceiling: 14,600 ft (4,500 m)
- Rate of climb: 840 ft/min (4.3 m/s)

== See also ==
Aircraft of comparable role, configuration, and era

- Beechcraft Musketeer
- Piper Cherokee
