= Allegheny Airlines Flight 853 =

1969 mid-air collision in Indiana

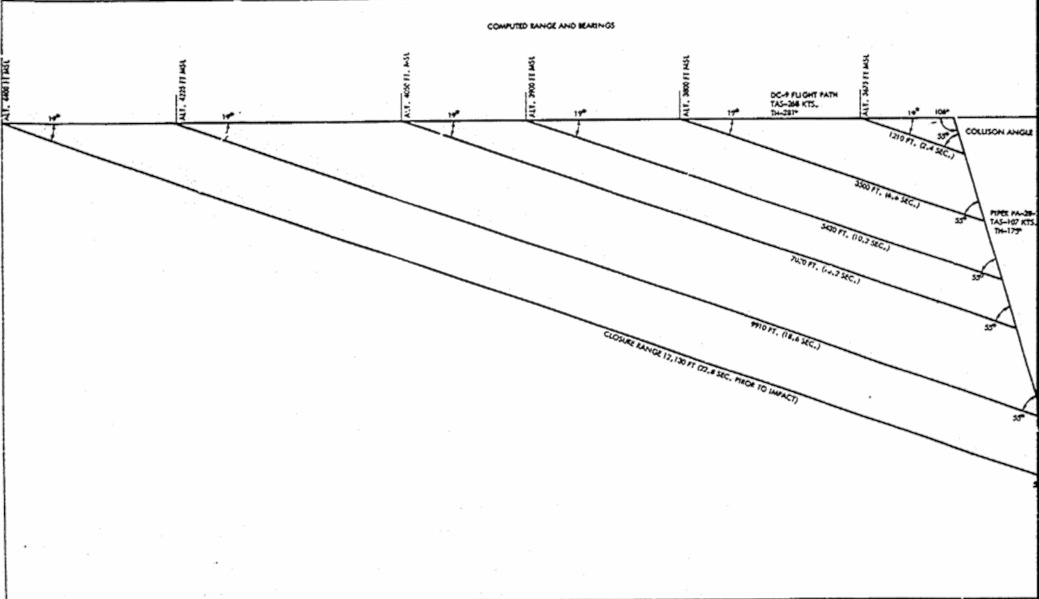
- Diagram of the collision angle

Accident
- Date: September 9, 1969
- Summary: Mid-air collision
- Site: Moral Township, Shelby County, Indiana, United States; 39°37′02″N 85°55′14″W
- Total fatalities: 83
- Total survivors: 0

First aircraft
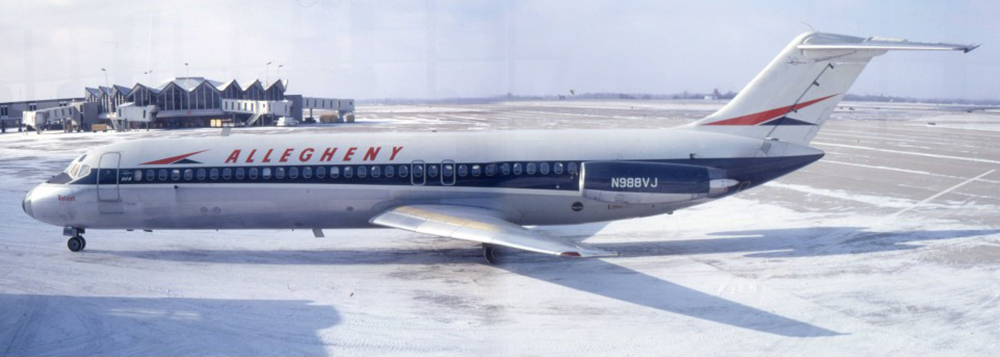
- N988VJ, the McDonnell Douglas DC-9-31 involved in the collision, seen in 1968
- Type: McDonnell Douglas DC-9-31
- Operator: Allegheny Airlines
- IATA flight No.: AL853
- ICAO flight No.: ALO853
- Call sign: ALLEGHENY 853
- Registration: N988VJ
- Flight origin: Boston Logan Airport
- 1st stopover: Friendship International Airport
- 2nd stopover: Greater Cincinnati Airport
- 3rd stopover: Indianapolis International Airport
- Destination: St. Louis International Airport
- Occupants: 82
- Passengers: 78
- Crew: 4
- Fatalities: 82
- Survivors: 0

Second aircraft
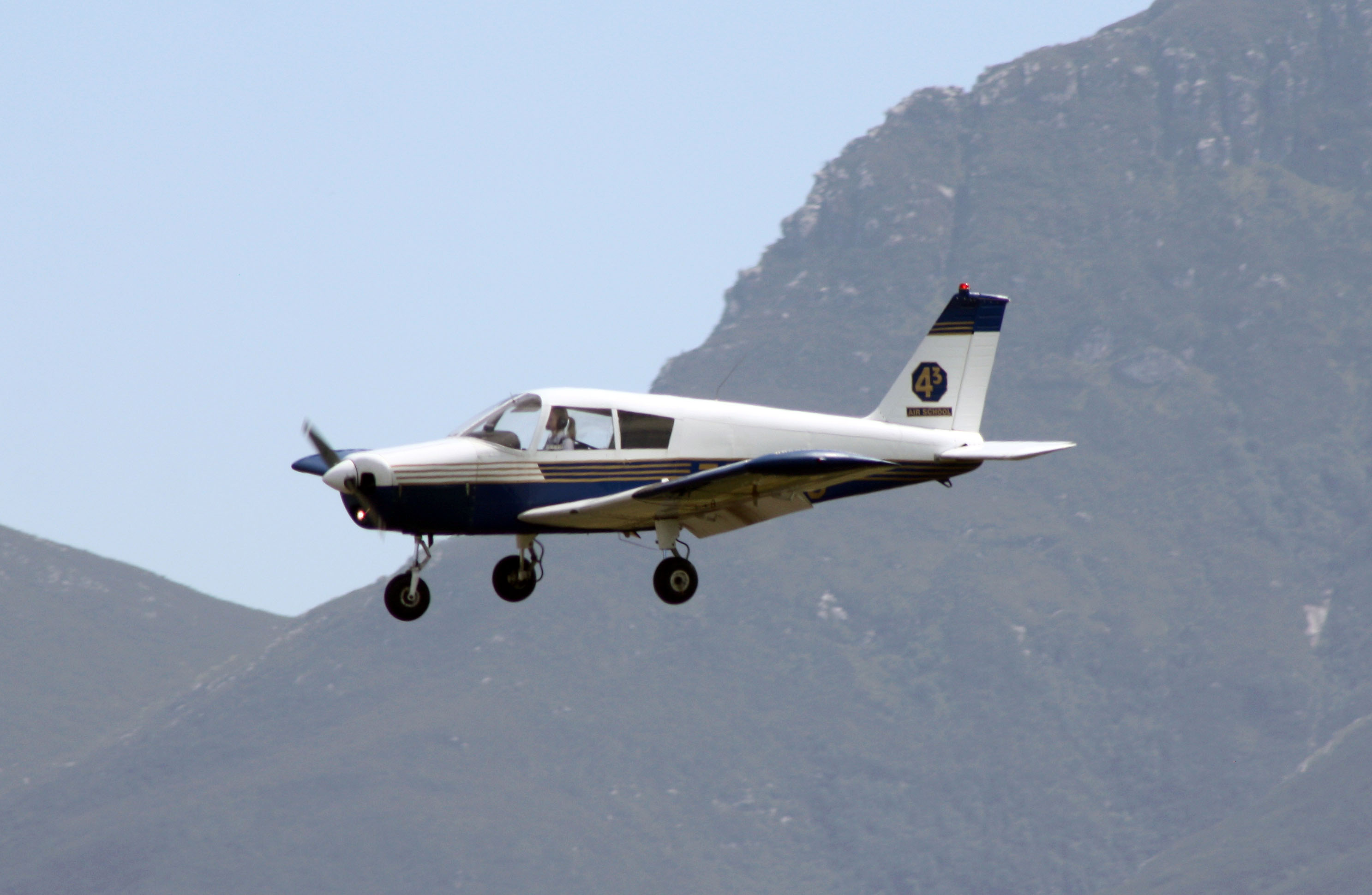
- A Piper PA-28-140, similar to the one involved in the collision
- Type: Piper PA-28-140
- Registration: N7374J
- Flight origin: Brookside Airpark, Brookside
- Destination: Columbus Municipal Airport Columbus
- Occupants: 1
- Crew: 1
- Fatalities: 1
- Survivors: 0

On September 9, 1969, Allegheny Airlines Flight 853, a McDonnell Douglas DC-9 operating a regularly scheduled flight from Boston, Massachusetts, to St. Louis, Missouri, with stops in Baltimore, Maryland; Cincinnati, Ohio; and Indianapolis, Indiana, collided mid-air with a Piper PA-28 light aircraft near Fairland, Indiana. The left wing of the PA-28 sheared off the DC-9's rear tail assembly, causing both to crash, killing all 83 occupants on board both aircraft. More than 50 years later, the incident remains Indiana's deadliest commercial airline disaster.

== Flight history ==
Allegheny Airlines Flight 853 was a regularly scheduled flight departing Boston Logan International Airport with a final destination of St. Louis International Airport (Lambert Field) with stopovers at Baltimore Friendship (now known as Baltimore-Washington International Airport), Greater Cincinnati (now known as Cincinnati/Northern Kentucky International), and Indianapolis Weir-Cook Municipal Airport (now known as Indianapolis International). The aircraft, N988VJ, was a McDonnell Douglas DC-9-31 manufactured in 1968 with 3170 hours on the airframe at the time of the incident. At the controls were Captain James Elrod, 47, a seasoned veteran with more than 23,800 flight hours, and First Officer William Heckendorn, 26. The flight departed from Cincinnati at 3:15 pm en route to Indianapolis, carrying 78 passengers and 4 crew members. Flying under instrument flight rules (IFR), it was initially cleared to ascend to airway V-97 at 10,000 feet. Approach Control then instructed it to descend to 6,000 feet (1,800 m); then 2,500 feet (760 m) after passing the Shelbyville VOR. The flight was then vectored to a 280 degree heading. This was the last recorded communication between Air Traffic Control and the aircraft.

The other aircraft, a privately owned Piper PA-28, was piloted by 34-year-old Robert Carey. He was attempting a solo cross-country flight, and was on a southeasterly heading. It departed Brookside Airpark at 3:21 pm, operating under a visual flight rule (VFR) flight plan which indicated a cruising altitude of 3,500 feet (1,100 m). It was not in communication with air traffic control and was not equipped with a transponder, and there was no evidence it appeared as a primary radar target on the radarscope. Though visibility was 15 miles, an intervening cloud condition prevented either aircraft from seeing the other until a few seconds prior to the collision.

With only a window of 14 seconds to see and react, neither aircraft nor the Air Traffic Controller noticed the impending collision, with the pilots of the DC-9 likely preparing for a 3,500 ft altitude call. The two aircraft converged at a relative speed of 350 mph (300 kn; 560 km/h), 4 miles northwest of Fairland, Indiana, at an altitude of 3,550 feet. The initial point of impact was at the forward upper right section of the DC-9's vertical stabilizer, just underneath the horizontal stabilizer. On the Piper, the impact point was just forward of the left wing root. The impact severed the entire tail assembly of the DC-9, which rolled left until it was inverted and crashed nose-down into a soybean field at an approximate speed of 400 mph (350 kn; 640 km/h), about 100 yards (300 ft; 100 m) north of the Shady Acres mobile home park. The PA-28 broke up mid-air and crashed approximately 4,500 feet (1,400 m) from the DC-9.

== Probable cause ==
The National Transportation Safety Board released the following probable cause in a report adopted July 15, 1970:

The Board determines the probable cause of this accident to be the deficiencies in the collision avoidance capability of the Air Traffic Control system of the FAA in a terminal area wherein there was mixed instrument flight rules (IFR) and visual flight rules (VFR) traffic. The deficiencies included the inadequacy of the see-and-avoid concept under the circumstances of this case; the technical limitations of radar in detecting all aircraft; and the absence of Federal Aviation Regulations which would provide a system of adequate separation of mixed VFR and IFR traffic in terminal areas.

== Legacy ==
The NTSB and FAA realized the inherent limitations of the "see and be seen" principle of air traffic separation in visual meteorological conditions, especially involving aircraft of dissimilar speeds or cloud layers and other restrictions to visibility. Over a period of years, following similar incidents and taking advantage of technological advances, the two agencies drove a number of corrective steps for the aviation industry, including:

- Transponders are now installed in most general aviation aircraft and all commercial aircraft, dramatically increasing radar visibility of lower and slower-flying smaller aircraft, especially near atmospheric disturbances or other clutter (see Air Traffic Control Radar Beacon System and Secondary Surveillance Radar)
- Most airports with scheduled airline service now have a surrounding controlled airspace (ICAO designation Class B or Class C) for improved IFR and VFR traffic separation; all aircraft must be transponder-equipped and in communication with air traffic control to operate within this controlled airspace
- Most commercial and air-carrier aircraft (and many smaller, general aviation aircraft) now have an airborne collision avoidance or TCAS device on board that can detect and warn about nearby transponder-equipped traffic
- ATC radar systems now have "conflict alert"—automated ground-based collision avoidance software that sounds an alarm when aircraft come within a minimum safe separation distance

== See also ==
- List of notable civilian mid-air collisions
- 2025 Potomac River mid-air collision
