= Proteus Airlines Flight 706 =

1998 mid-air collision over France

- A photograph taken seconds after the collision

Accident
- Date: 30 July 1998
- Summary: Mid-air collision due to pilot error on the B1900D aircraft
- Site: Quiberon Bay; 47.5044°N 2.9892°W
- Total fatalities: 15
- Total survivors: 0

First aircraft
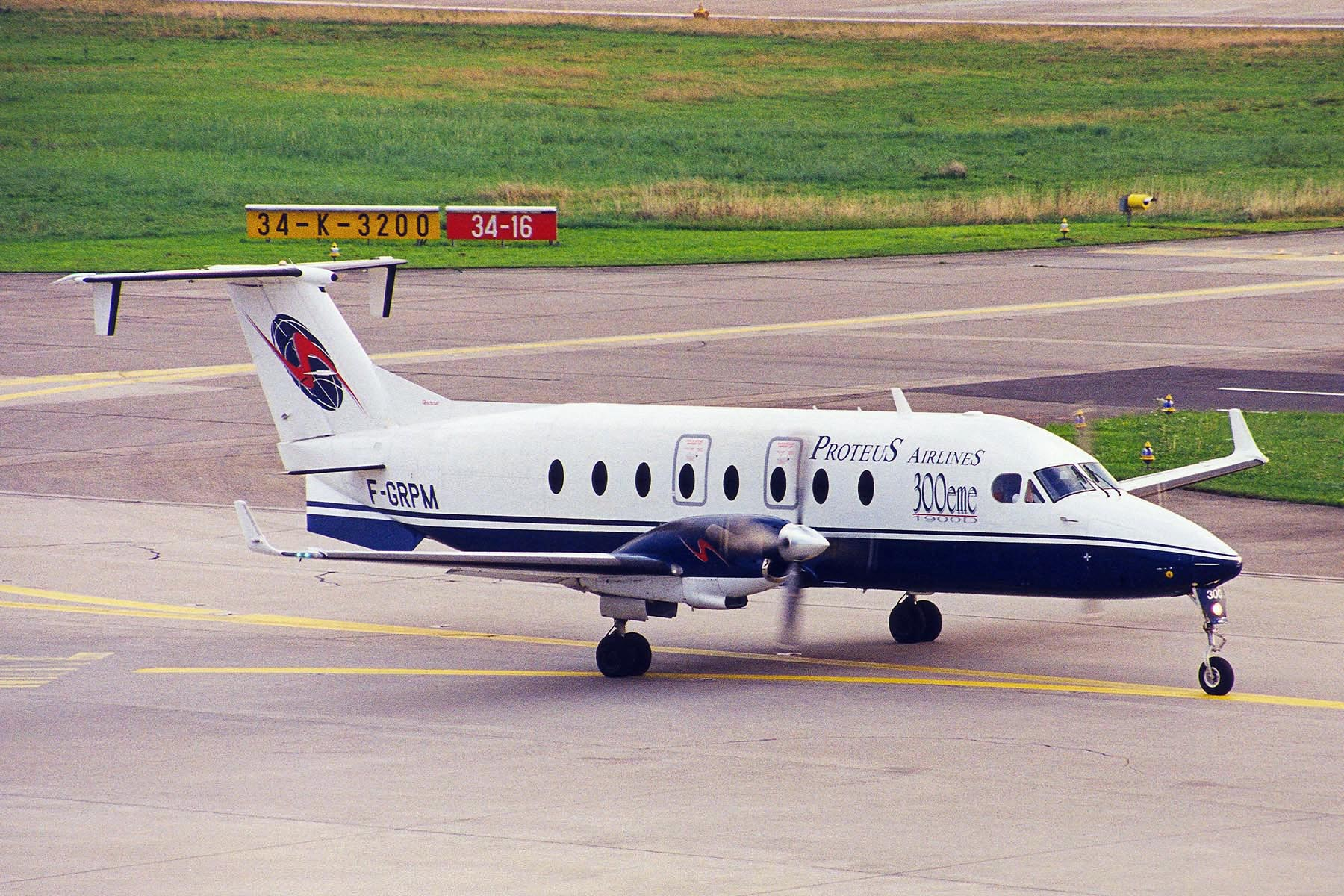
- A Proteus Airlines Beechcraft 1900D, similar to the aircraft involved
- Type: Beechcraft 1900D
- Operator: Proteus Airlines
- IATA flight No.: YS706
- ICAO flight No.: PRB706
- Call sign: PROTEUS 706
- Registration: F-GSJM
- Flight origin: Lyon Satolas Airport; Lyon, France
- Destination: Lorient-Lann Bihoué Airport; Lorient, France
- Occupants: 14
- Passengers: 12
- Crew: 2
- Fatalities: 14
- Survivors: 0

Second aircraft
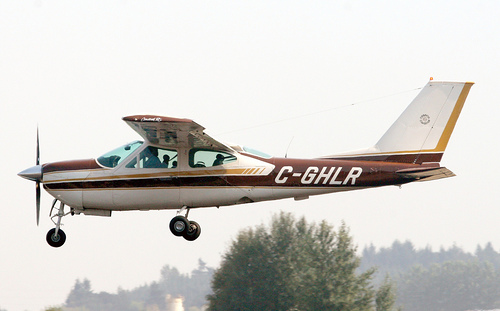
- A Cessna 177RG Cardinal, similar to the one involved in the collision
- Type: Cessna 177RG Cardinal
- Operator: Private
- Registration: F-GAJE
- Flight origin: Vannes Airport; Meucon, France
- Occupants: 1
- Crew: 1
- Fatalities: 1
- Survivors: 0

Proteus Airlines Flight 706 was a scheduled commuter flight from Lyon, France to Lorient, France. On 30 July 1998, the Beechcraft 1900 operating the flight collided in mid-air with a Cessna 177 over Quiberon Bay, Brittany. Both aircraft crashed in the sea, killing all 15 occupants on both planes.

== Accident ==
Flight 706 took off from Lyon–Saint-Exupéry at 14:21 local time (12:21 UTC) on a flight to Lorient Lann-Bihoué airport. About seventy minutes into the flight, the crew made a request to the Lorient approach controller to deviate from their route slightly to the west to Quiberon Bay. The reason for this detour was to give the passengers and crew a view of the SS Norway (previously named SS France), at that time the longest ocean liner ever built in France. Later examinations of the 1900D's cockpit voice recorder revealed that a passenger made his way to the cockpit and told the pilot and co-pilot of the presence of the Norway nearby, then suggested that the crew fly the aircraft closer to the ship. At the time of this request, a Cessna 177 registered F-GAJE belonging to a local flying club took off from the airfield at Vannes for a local flight to Quiberon.

At 15:53, after first being cleared to descend to 3,700 feet (1,100 m) over the bay, the Proteus crew contacted air traffic control again and cancelled their flight plan to operate under instrument flight rules, switching to visual flight rules; they then put the 1900D into a descent from 2,500 feet (760 m) to 2,000 feet (610 m) while making a 360° turn around the ship. At 15:56, the pilot of the Cessna contacted the flight information service at Quiberon as he passed Larmor-Baden and informed them of his intent to descend from 3,000 feet (910 m) to 1,500 feet (460 m). At 15:57, the Proteus crew announced to the Lorient approach controller that they had reached the end of their 360° turn and asked to take a direct course for Lorient. After they received confirmation of this request at 15:58, the Proteus aircraft collided with the Cessna. The cockpit voice recording ended at the moment of collision, and the flight data recording ended two seconds later; in those two seconds, the airplane rolled from 7.1 to 56 degrees left and pitched down 95 degrees. Both aircraft immediately fell to the water, killing all 14 passengers and crew on board the Beechcraft, as well as the sole occupant of the 177.

Rescuers in speedboats and helicopters assisted in the search and rescue.

== Investigation ==
Location of the collision

The investigation found that the Cessna's transponder had not been switched on. In documentation published by the Aeronautical Information Service in 1997 and 1998 and probably used by the pilot of the Cessna, the use of a transponder while operating under visual flight rules could be interpreted as optional. As a result of the transponder being off, the Cessna was not depicted on the radar screen of the Lorient approach controller and its traffic information could not be relayed to the crew of the Beechcraft. In communicating with an AFIS controller at Quiberon, the pilot of the Cessna was likewise not informed of the presence of the Beechcraft. While a traffic collision avoidance system (TCAS) system on the Beechcraft would not have prevented the accident without the Cessna's transponder operating, the report also noted that the BF Goodrich TCAS installed in the Beechcraft at the factory had been removed due to not yet being approved for operation in France. Had the Cessna's transponder not been turned off and the Beechcraft's TCAS not been uninstalled, a pilot with expected reaction time would likely have avoided the collision by about 300 feet (91 m).

The investigation also revealed that the organization of activity in the Beechcraft's cockpit as well as its ergonomics during the left-hand 360° turn did not allow for effective monitoring during the merger of the two aircraft, particularly to the outside of the turn, placing the Cessna in the Beechcraft's blind spot. The position of the sun as well as the configuration of the Cessna's fuselage and nose cowling were thought to have impeded the view of the Cessna's pilot in the moments just prior to the collision.

Following this accident, the BEA recommended that pilots should only cancel instrument flight rules flight plans in cases of necessity.

== Dramatization ==
This accident was featured in the 16th season of the Canadian TV series Mayday. It aired on 5 July 2016 and is titled Deadly Detour.

== See also ==
- List of notable mid-air collisions
- Hughes Airwest Flight 706, 1971 crash involving a DC-9 operating with the same flight number
