= Next Generation Network Enabled Weather =

Aviation weather technology

Next Generation (NextGen) Network Enabled Weather (NNEW) is a project to develop a 4-dimension (all points, lateral, vertical and time dimensions) weather data cube (4-D Wx Data Cube) from disparate contributors and locations.

== Description ==
Weather has a considerable impact on aviation operations. Providing the accurate and timely weather information required by aviation decision makers is an element of the Next Generation Air Transportation System. This will increase airspace capacity, improve efficiency, and improve air safety.

NNEW will provide fast access to weather information to all National Airspace System users by the provision of the 4-D Wx Data Cube. The 4-D Wx Data Cube will consist of:

1. a virtual weather network containing data from various existing databases within the Federal Aviation Administration (FAA), National Oceanic and Atmospheric Administration (NOAA) and the United States Department of Defense (DOD), as well as participating commercial weather data providers
2. the ability to translate between the various standards so that data can be provided in user required units and coordinate systems
3. the ability to support retrieval requests for large data volumes, such as along a flight trajectory

A subset of the data published to the 4-D Wx Data Cube will be designated the Single Authoritative Source (SAS). The SAS is that data that must be consistent (only one answer) to support collaborative (more than one decision maker) air traffic management decisions.

Weather data distribution mechanisms are being developed by the NOAA Research Applications Laboratory (NCAR), NOAA Global Systems Division and the Massachusetts Institute of Technology Lincoln Laboratory. Contributions to standards are being made to the Open Geospatial Consortium. Standards and specifications developed and/or used by NNEW will be layered on top of core services provided by the FAA System Wide Information Management (SWIM) program.

== Benefits ==
Direct machine access and integration by decision support tools will reduce the need for interpretation of aviation weather data and will enable better air transportation decision making.
