= Personal Air Transportation Alliance =

- Predecessor: Frequent and Safe Transportation from Every Runway
- Formation: May 2005
- Founded at: EAA AirVenture Oshkosh
- Dissolved: December 2008
- Type: Innovation Alliance
- Legal status: Non-Profit, unincorporated 501(c)(6)
- Purpose: To identify, articulate, and promote those concepts, technologies and processes that facilitate frequent and safe transportation from every runway
- Headquarters: San Francisco, CA
- Members: Twenty-two (22) organizations Kenneth Ross- Co-Chair Michael Baur- Co-Chair
- Key people: Robert Dunn- Government Relations Paul A. Masson- Executive Director Jack Olcott- Industry Relations

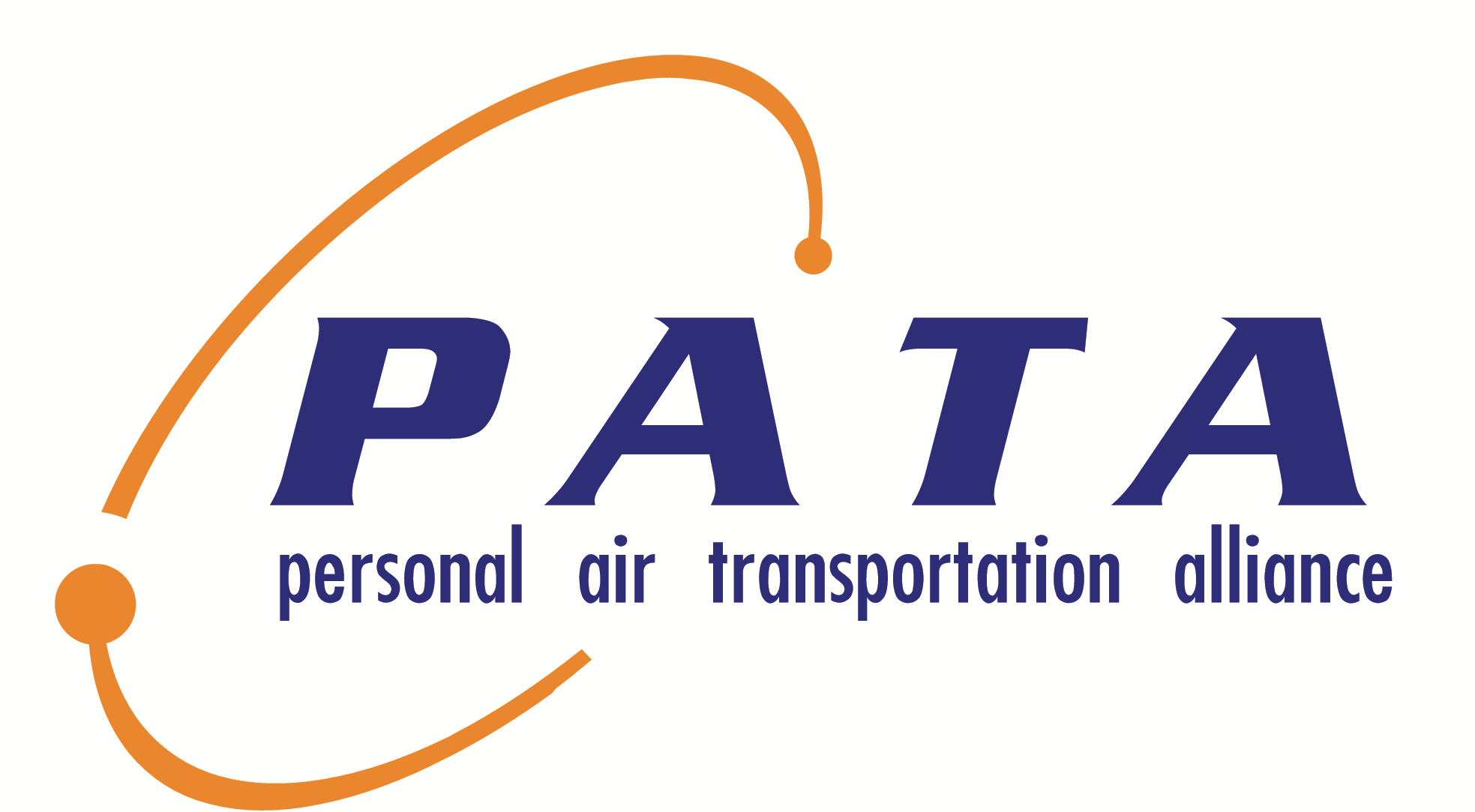

The Personal Air Transportation Alliance (PATA) was an innovation alliance of aviation transportation operators, suppliers and regional transportation research organizations that formed a non-profit organization in 2005 to define, advance and advocate new technologies and transportation systems models for personal transportation from small, regional airports outside the traditional hub-and-spoke system. PATA's purpose was to identify, articulate and promote those concepts, technologies and processes that facilitate frequent and safe air-taxi transportation from every runway. The Alliance compiled information about the air transportation business model impacts on the National Airspace System (NAS) from adoption of very light jets (VLJ) as a basis for future fleets of VLJs, propeller driven and electric rotorcraft passenger aircraft operating in the NAS. The alliance also advocated for demonstrations of NexGen Air Traffic Control (ATC) technologies and procedures at airports they served.

== History ==
The Personal Air Transportation Alliance (PATA) was formed by mutual agreement of five (5) air taxi and air charter operators attending the EAA AirVenture Oshkosh show in the summer of 2005. The EAA event included flight demonstrations of small business jets offered for use as air taxis. The company representatives in attendance included Pogo Jet, Eclipse Aviation, Cirrus Aircraft, Linear Air, North American Jet. The mutual agreement was in response to the announcement of NASA's completion of the Small Aircraft Transportation System (SATS) Program flight demonstrations of small aircraft use in personal transportation by air taxi and air charter companies. The SATS Program managers stated it was beyond their scope to articulate and communicate the "SATS Vision" to national transportation planning authorities in the Joint Planning and Development Office (JPDO) that were evaluating the integration of very light jets and other small aircraft into the new Next Generation Aviation Systems (NGATS).

The Small Aircraft Transportation System (SATS) was a project of the National Aeronautics and Space Administration (NASA) with the objective of developing and testing four operational capabilities to enable safe and affordable access to virtually any runway in the nation in most weather conditions. These operating capabilities rely on on-board computing, advanced flight controls, Highway in the Sky displays, and automated air traffic separation and sequencing technologies for development and testing in general aviation aircraft. The project was organized to be implemented through multiple partnership activities with the Federal Aviation Administration (FAA) and state aeronautics authorities working with regional test organizations designated "SATS Labs" through the National Consortium for Aviation Mobility (NCAM).

== Purpose: vision, mission and objectives ==
The PATA organizing members created a Statement of Purpose:

Vision: An effective alliance composed of aviation industry leaders established for the protection, safety and enhancement of personal air transportation.

Mission: To identify, articulate, and promote those concepts, technologies, and processes that facilitate frequent and safe personal air transportation from every runway.

Objectives:

- Pool knowledge and support research and development of technologies and processes that will provide value to the personal air transportation industry as a basis for an emerging small aircraft transportation system through contributions to:

- The Next Generation Air Transportation System (NGATS) National Roadmap
- Development of common operational concepts
- Development of common technologies and systems architectures
- Development of standards and interoperability for targeted technology systems
- Creation of common certification paths
- Expanded availability of new aircraft with lower operating costs

- Create public understanding and acceptance of the value, safety, and use for air-taxis as a reflection of a new small aircraft transportation system
- Facilitate the personal air transportation system deployment by the establishment of links between new aircraft, expanded small airports, and new air traffic systems concepts and technologies

== Members ==
By February 2006, membership participation in PATA had grown to include:

- Adam Aircraft
- Airdialog LLC, dba Linear Air
- Air Limo, Inc.
- Cessna Aircraft
- Cirrus Aircraft
- Consortium for Aviation Systems Advancement, Inc. (CASA)
- DayJet, Inc.
- Eclipse Aviation, LLC
- First Flight Aviation (formerly Blue Ash Charters)
- GE Honda Aero Engines, Inc.
- General Aero
- InformArt, dba Gary Air
- Indiana SATS, Inc.
- Israeli Aircraft Industries, Ltd.
- L-3 Communications
- Maryland Advanced Development Lab
- North American Jet
- Munro & Associates
- Pogo Jet
- Pratt & Whitney, Canada, Ltd.
- Research Triangle Institute
- Sky Taxi, LLC

== Projects and work teams ==
PATA created nine (9) projects work teams that compiled confidential data and information from members to prepare market definitions, proposed Concepts of Operations, shared architectural guidelines and technical standards for supply chain alignment. The pooling of confidential information was accomplished through non-disclosure agreements between each member and the Alliance administrator which provided a summary back to membership. The project work teams included:

- Airports
- AirTaxi Definition
- AirTaxi Models
- Economic Benefits
- Markets
- Next Generation Aviation Transportation System Modernization
- Research Priorities
- Safety
- Security

Each work team undertook secondary and primary research to create a guidelines for use among members in commercial adoption of fleets of turboprop and very light jets for purposes of air-taxi and air-charter. Findings were presented to the Joint Planning and Development Office (JPDO).

== Transportation Planning and Investment Representations Disputes: DayJet and Eclipse ==
PATA members engaged in two internal disputes between 2007 and 2008.

PATA membership required members' disclosure of confidential information regarding business models including fleet size, operations, financing and research and development. The information was compiled into a summary provided to the Federal Joint Planning and Development Office (JPDO) for purposes of projecting transportation system needs and impacts expected from fleet deployment small (general aviation) aircraft. The same information was provided at investor events for members prior to closed-door-meetings to match early stage, startup companies with potential investors. Internal PATA manager due diligence found that two members, DayJet and Eclipse Aviation reported fleet financing and achievement of milestones to the JPDO and investors that were incomplete or incorrect.

== Dissolution closure ==
PATA completed its research in June 2007 and was dissolved in December 2008.

== See also ==
- National Airspace System
- Next Generation Air Transportation System (NextGen)
- Joint Planning and Development Office (JPDO)
- Advanced Air Mobility
- Small Aircraft Transportation System
- Advanced General Aviation Transport Experiments
- Very light jet
