= North European ATM Industry Group =

Manager and member of the SESAR programme

North-European ATM Industry Group (NATMIG), is a consortium member in the European public-private partnership that is managing the development phase of the Single European Sky ATM Research (SESAR) Programme .

== Overview ==
NATMIG aims at participation in the SESAR project thus developing the future airport systems according to the ATM Master Plan.

== Legal basis ==
A consortium agreement defines how these close competitors will work together.

== Funding and Budget ==
NATMIG is taking part in the €700 million industrial share of the SJU PPP.

The project is valued at €36 million.

== Members ==
The members (equal shares) of the NATMIG Consortium are:

- Airtel ATN of Ireland (webpage)
- Saab AB of Sweden(webpage)
- SINTEF of Norway (webpage)
- originally Northrop Grumman Park Air Systems of Norway, now Indra Navia AS (webpage) - NGPAS was sold to Indra Sistemas SA in April 2012 and have changed name to Indra Navia AS
