= ASPM =

ASPM may refer to:

- ASPM (gene), a human gene
- Active State Power Management, a computer power management protocol
- Aviation System Performance Metrics, an FAA database of the National Airspace System

== See also ==
- Aspirant de marine, a French Canadian subordinate officer
