= Datacom (disambiguation) =

A computer network is a set of computers sharing resources located on or provided by network nodes.

Datacom may also refer to:

- Data communication
- DATACOM/DB, a relational database for IBM mainframes
- Datacom Group, a New Zealand-based IT company
- Next Generation Data Communications (DataComm), an initiative to replace some voice communications between pilots and air traffic control with textual messages
