= Next Generation Air Transportation System =

US airspace system modernization project

The Next Generation Air Transportation System (NextGen) was the U.S. Federal Aviation Administration (FAA) program to modernize the National Airspace System (NAS). The FAA began work on NextGen improvements in 2007 and is planned to finish implementation by 2030. Modernization goals in NextGen included using new technologies and procedures to increase NAS safety, efficiency, capacity, access, flexibility, predictability, and resilience while reducing aviation's environmental impact.

== History ==
The need for NextGen became apparent during the summer of 2000 when air travel was impeded by severe congestion and costly delays. Two years later, the Commission on the Future of the U.S. Aerospace Industry recommended that a multiagency task force develop an integrated plan to transform the U.S. air transportation system.

In 2003, the US Congress passed the Vision 100—Century of Aviation Reauthorization Act, which established the Joint Planning and Development Office (JPDO) to create a unified vision of what the U.S. air transportation system should deliver for the next generation and beyond, to develop and coordinate long-term research plans, and to sponsor cross-agency mission research.

The result of the JPDO's efforts was the creation of the "Integrated National Plan for the Next Generation Air Transportation System" in 2004, which defined high-level goals, objectives, and requirements to transform the air transportation system. In addition to the US Department of Transportation and FAA, the plan involved other government agencies with responsibilities in air transportation services, including the National Aeronautics and Space Administration (NASA), National Weather Service, Department of Defense, and Transportation Security Administration.

The JPDO released the "Concept of Operations for the Next Generation Air Transportation System" to the aviation stakeholder community in 2007. The concept of operations provided the overview of NextGen goals for 2025. Growth of the NextGen concept was evolutionary, and the JPDO document continued to be updated through 2011. The same year, the FAA published the first version of its expanded Operational Evolution Partnership, which outlined the agency's path to NextGen through 2025.

The original integrated national plan included airport surface and passenger terminal operations and was known as a "curb-to-curb" solution. The concept of operations was intended to drive cross-agency research to validate the concepts and to eliminate ideas and alternatives that were not operationally feasible or beneficial. The FAA focused on the pieces of the air transportation system for which it was responsible—the "gate-to-gate" components. In 2011, the FAA published the report "NextGen Mid-Term Concept of Operations for the National Airspace System." The FAA concept of operations was consistent with the JPDO's broad set of objectives, including maintaining safety and security, increasing capacity and efficiency, ensuring access to airspace and airports, and mitigating environmental impacts. The report identified several key transformational concepts as necessary to achieve NextGen goals and objectives, such as precision navigation and network-enabled information access.

Changes were underway in 2008 when the FAA started to move key parts of NextGen, such as Automatic Dependent Surveillance–Broadcast (ADS-B), from design to delivery. NextGen progress involved expanded research and development capability, participation by the aviation industry and international partners, and support by the White House and Congress, which are highlighted in this section.

The agency established a research and development facility, known as a testbed, at Embry-Riddle Aeronautical University in Daytona Beach, Florida, in 2008. In 2010, the FAA dedicated another testbed, the NextGen Integration and Evaluation Capability Laboratory at the William J. Hughes Technical Center in Atlantic City, New Jersey, for researchers to simulate and evaluate the effects of NextGen components on the NAS. The lab's capability grew in 2013 with a contract awarded to General Dynamics to provide engineering, software design and development, infrastructure, and administrative support.

In 2008, the FAA signed agreements with Honeywell and ACSS to accelerate testing and installation of NextGen technology to detect and alert pilots of safety hazards on the airport surface. NetJets also agreed to equip part of its fleet to test some programs in various areas of the United States. By 2010, the FAA awarded Computer Support Services Incorporated a $280 million contract to perform engineering work for NextGen, the first of six contracts that would be awarded under an umbrella portfolio contract. Boeing, General Dynamics, and ITT Incorporated received FAA contracts worth up to $4.4 billion to demonstrate on a large scale how NextGen concepts, procedures, and technologies could be integrated into the current NAS. In 2012, the FAA selected Harris Corp., which then subcontracted Dataprobe, to develop the NAS Voice System and manage a $331 million Data Communications Integrated Services contract. The FAA and Harris Corporation canceled the contract for the NAS Voice System in 2018, and there was no replacement.

Airlines also became involved in NextGen. In 2011, the FAA signed an agreement with JetBlue to allow the carrier to fly select flights equipped with ADS-B, opening the airline to improved routing and giving the FAA NextGen data through real-time operational evaluations. United Airlines in 2013 announced plans to become the first carrier to equip a portion of its fleet with avionics necessary for Data Communications (Data Comm) under the FAA NextGen Data Comm avionics equipage program. The program was funded to equip 1,900 aircraft across the industry to ensure enough aircraft would participate in Data Comm.

To develop industry consensus for the FAA's midterm goals, the agency established a new task force through RTCA, Incorporated in 2009. The FAA wanted the task force to examine how industry could contribute to and benefit from NextGen, and the agency unveiled a plan in 2010 on how to implement recommendations.

The NextGen Advisory Committee (NAC), established in 2010 to address the task force recommendation to continue industry collaboration, is a federal advisory group comprising aviation stakeholders formed to advise on policy-level NextGen implementation issues facing the aviation community. The FAA and NAC in 2014 agreed on the NextGen Priorities Joint Implementation Plan to accelerate delivery of four core NextGen initiatives over three years to improve efficiency: optimizing operations at airports with multiple runways, increasing the efficiency of surface operations, updating to performance-based navigation that is primarily satellite-enabled, and improving communications between aircraft and the ground through a digital system.

International air traffic management interoperability and system harmonization for improved safety and efficiency is another FAA objective. In 2010, the FAA and the European Commission agreed to cooperate in 22 areas to help in joint research and development of NextGen and Single European Sky ATM Research (SESAR) projects. By 2012, the FAA and the A6 alliance of European air navigation service providers agreed to work toward an interoperable aviation system, and work together to deploy and implement NextGen and SESAR.

Executive Order 13479, Transformation of the National Air Transportation System, signed in 2008 mandated the Secretary of Transportation to establish a NextGen support staff. The FAA Modernization and Reform Act of 2012 included establishing deadlines for adopting existing NextGen navigation and surveillance technology and mandated development of performance-based navigation procedures at the nation's 35 busiest airports by 2015.

In 2010, the FAA's Aviation Safety organization released a work plan that identified how the safety staff would set NextGen standards and oversee safe implementation of new technologies, processes, and procedures. The FAA also issued a final rule mandating NextGen performance requirements for aircraft surveillance equipment. It required aircraft flying in a large portion of controlled U.S. airspace to be equipped for ADS-B Out by January 1, 2020.

A key resource for the NAS’s journey from NextGen to the future is the NAS Enterprise Architecture (EA). The EA describes the evolution of air traffic control through the FAA’s implementation of infrastructure, technologies, and new services. The NAS EA documents current and future mission-critical and mission-support systems and includes roadmaps to help identify, track, and mature concepts, systems, and services that will further advance the NAS.

The NAS EA helps transform the NAS by communicating system responsibilities and enhancing NAS operations. This architecture is intended to facilitate the consolidation of functions and systems while continuing to meet the aviation community's evolving needs.

Using the results of the FAA’s research to actual operations, the EA is designed to remain valuable beyond NextGen, into the modernization work of the near future.

Via NextGen, the FAA has moved the NAS forward. A transition to satellite-enabled navigation and surveillance, along with the supplementation of voice with digital communications, are examples of work that has made the NAS better equipped for future technological advances. The advances of NextGen have allowed new entrants to the NAS, including unmanned aircraft, commercial space vehicles, and drones. Safety has guided the process of creating mechanisms and processes for these new entrants to operate in the skies. Testing continues beyond 2025 as the variety of entrants expands and the complexity of operations increases.

The NAS faces increasing operational complexity as unmanned vehicles become more prevalent in the national airspace. The FAA has developed mechanisms and processes to support the integration of these vehicles into the NAS.

The programs and upgrades of NextGen have integrated systems together in new ways, streamlining processes, and creating a safer system and more efficient airspace for travelers and operators.

The NAS has evolved from a ground-based system of air traffic control into a satellite-based system of air traffic control due to NextGen. The NAS is now able to let operators share information more easily, while supporting more diverse and complex flight operations.

== Justification ==
A Department of Transportation 30-year outlook report published in 2016, "Beyond Traffic: Trends and Choices 2045", estimated flight delays and congestion cost the U.S. economy more than $20 billion each year. In addition, the report predicted the total number of people flying on U.S. airlines would increase by 50 percent over the next two decades. For capacity to keep pace with increased demand for services, changes were needed in how services were provided.

In 2022, civil air transportation contributed $1.8 trillion in U.S. economic activity, supported 9.4 million jobs, and made up 4 percent of the U.S. gross domestic product. NextGen delivers benefits to continue to support U.S. aviation. Air traffic controllers have better information to track and separate aircraft safely and efficiently. Pilots have more aeronautical, traffic, and weather information in the cockpit. Airlines can fly shorter, more direct routes to get passengers to their destinations faster while burning less fuel and producing fewer emissions.

NextGen helps aircraft operators, passengers, the government, and the general public through enhanced safety, greater efficiency, and increased capacity. Monetized benefits comprise internal FAA cost savings, reduced passenger travel time, decreased aircraft operating costs, lower fuel consumption, fewer travel delays, avoided cancellations, additional flights, reduced carbon dioxide emissions, reduced injuries and fatalities, and fewer aircraft losses and damages. NextGen systems can also increase controller and pilot productivity, such as with Data Communications.

NextGen improvements are estimated to save 2.8 billion gallons of fuel through 2030 and reduce carbon emissions by more than 650 million metric tons from 2020 to 2040. The FAA tracks total benefits measured from more than 20 NextGen capabilities through more than 200 implementations across the nation. Implemented changes have produced an estimated $12.3 billion in benefits from 2010 to 2024.

== Implementation ==
As the NextGen concept formed, the FAA planned its implementation. The agency worked with industry to identify capabilities taking advantage of existing aircraft equipage. This strategy enabled airspace users to realize early benefits while keeping NextGen on course to achieve the FAA's long-term goal of trajectory-based operations (TBO).

Next, the FAA started replacing its infrastructure. Based on previous lessons learned, the agency determined the best way to upgrade its services was to begin with a new infrastructure that could accommodate the latest enabling technologies and advanced capabilities rather than adding one-off improvements to an aging infrastructure that couldn't accomplish broader transformation.

The FAA programs for En Route Automation Modernization (ERAM) and Terminal Automation Modernization and Replacement (TAMR) are foundational pieces upon which the FAA could build the NextGen vision. These programs support NextGen objectives with modern software architectures that serve as the platform for new capabilities for air traffic controllers and managers.

The FAA used a widely accepted model for building large-scale automation systems. Program lifecycles are continuous with a planned schedule of technology refreshes. For example, the FAA finished installing the original hardware for ERAM in 2008, and completed software and program acceptance in 2015. In 2016, the agency updated the technology of all major system components that were becoming obsolete. This method is common to maintain the latest level of technology.

On top of the foundational systems, the FAA then identified key enabling systems that improve communications, navigation, surveillance, traffic flow automation, information sharing, and weather systems. Integrating these systems transforms air traffic management to keep pace with the growing needs of an increasingly diverse mix of air transportation system users without sacrificing safety.

Integration of capabilities is necessary to achieve TBO, which is a method of strategically planning and managing air traffic from airport to airport for optimal performance by using the aircraft's ability to fly precise paths, metering traffic flow using time instead of distance, and faster information sharing between pilots, flight dispatchers, and controllers and air traffic managers.

With TBO, the FAA and operators are expected to better know where and when an aircraft is anticipated to be throughout its flight. This information will be shared between air and ground automation systems and used to better assess how to balance demand and capacity, and minimize the consequences of disruptions due to weather, or system or facility outages. TBO's main benefits are improved flight efficiency, and increased throughput, predictability, and operator flexibility. Its initial operating areas are the Northeast Corridor, Mid-Atlantic Region, Northwest Mountain Region, and Southwest. TBO expanded to the Southeast in 2023.

The FAA Office of Airports Geographic Information System (GIS) program provides data to manage aeronautical information and NextGen implementation. GIS identifies the geographic location and characteristics of natural or constructed features or boundaries on the Earth's surface. The airport data is used to develop and implement obstruction analyses, more accurate Notices to Air Missions and flight deck airport moving map functionality, and Performance Based Navigation procedures, including Wide Area Augmentation System/Localizer Performance with Vertical Guidance approaches.

NextGen is a complex, large-scale system of systems implemented over decades. Systems are always in various stages of lifecycle management from research to technical refreshes. FAA planning reports are used to map the evolution from the legacy National Airspace System (NAS) to NextGen. To manage NextGen with short-term funding horizons, the FAA rolled out improvements in smaller increments with more program segments to ensure affordability.

The FAA is using knowledge gained since 2011 when it published the NextGen Mid-Term Concept of Operations. Working closely with stakeholders, the FAA invested in research and pre-implementation work to determine the feasibility of advanced concepts and their associated benefits. The aviation community understood that many, but not all, of the concepts would produce positive business cases once research and pre-implementation work was underway, and that some goals would be replaced by other concepts in an evolving aviation environment. The FAA refined the path that the NextGen planners envisioned with a few adjustments, eliminating some concepts that were high cost, high risk, or of low benefit based on research and industry feedback.

Six concepts that posed too high a technical risk, for instance, those with no available technical solution, were deferred beyond 2030. Some concepts that required more research to garner evidence of perceived operational benefits also were deferred for implementation into the later segments of NextGen.

The FAA had scheduled initial implementation of all major planned systems by 2025 but not the full integration necessary to provide the complete set of anticipated NextGen benefits. The agency now expects to finish implementation of all the main NextGen components by 2030. Benefits will accrue through enterprise-level advanced applications, more aircraft equipage, and full workforce adoption of TBO.

== Elements ==
NextGen encompassed many technologies, policies, and procedures. Changes to communications, navigation, surveillance, automation, information management, weather, and other areas were implemented after thorough safety testing.

=== Communications ===
Data Comm (Controller-Pilot Data Link Communications) uses digital text messages to supplement voice communications between pilots and air traffic controllers. Unlike voice messages, Data Comm messages sent by controllers are delivered only to the intended aircraft, which eliminates the chance of another pilot acting on instructions for another aircraft with a similar call sign. It avoids the chance of misunderstood messages because of busy radio chatter or variations in the way people speak, and it can be a backup if a microphone malfunctions. It also preserves radio bandwidth when voice communication is necessary or preferred.

Using Data Comm, tower air traffic controllers can send pilots of equipped aircraft departure clearance instructions to read, accept, and load into their flight management system with the push of a button. Messages also are sent to flight dispatchers, giving everyone a shared awareness for faster reactions to changing circumstances, such as approaching thunderstorms.

Data Comm saves aircraft time waiting to take off, particularly when routes change, which reduces fuel use and engine exhaust emissions. It lowers the chances of delays or cancellations when weather affects the flight route. Pilots and controllers also can spend more time on other critical tasks, which enhances safety.

The first part of the program, tower service, for 55 airports finished in 2016 more than two years ahead of schedule. Based on the initial success, airlines requested and the FAA approved in 2017 seven more airports to receive tower service to be completed by 2019. The first of these airports completed was Joint Base Andrews in November 2017. The final airport was Van Nuys, which was completed in August 2018. In 2020, Cincinnati, Jacksonville, and Palm Beach were authorized to become the next three airports approved to operate Data Comm. Cincinnati started operating in 2021, and Jacksonville and Palm Beach began in 2022.

Data Comm provides more benefits to airlines and passengers when aircraft are in flight. Various air traffic controller messages are available, including the ability to reroute multiple aircraft. Initial Data Comm services for high-altitude flight started in November 2019. As of 2025, it has scaled to 65 airports, connecting over 11,000 equipped aircraft, 23 U.S. air carriers, 106 non-U.S. air carriers, and more than 5,000 general and business aviation aircraft. And, as of 2025, Data Comm En Route services operate continuously across all 20 Air Route Traffic Control Centers, supporting 68 commercial operators and more than 8,000 equipped aircraft. Full en route services, which bring a wider array of messages than initial services, are scheduled to be complete at all centers in 2027. Enhanced services are planned after full en route services. These will include tools to support trajectory management, such as traffic management coordinator-initiated reroutes.

Voice communication will always be part of air traffic control. In critical situations, it continues to be the primary form of controller-pilot interaction. However, for routine communications between pilots and controllers, Data Comm is preferred as it increases efficiency and airspace capacity. Data Comm is expected to save operators more than $10 billion over the 30-year life cycle of the program and the FAA about $1 billion in future operating costs.

=== Navigation ===
At the heart of NextGen’s vision was a fundamental shift in how aircraft navigate the skies. That transformation began with the embrace of satellite-based guidance, and matured through the widespread adoption of Performance Based Navigation (PBN), a shift that redefined the structure and function of the NAS.

Before NextGen, aircraft navigation was largely tethered to fixed, ground-based navigational aids (VORs, NDBs) that shaped the physical layout of air routes. The introduction of PBN marked a departure from those constraints. Using Global Navigation Satellite Systems (GNSS), including GPS, pilots gained access to precise, flexible routing options that allowed aircraft to move more directly and predictably across all phases of flight.

By 2012, PBN had become a foundational element of the NextGen Implementation Plan. Since then, the FAA has overseen the gradual replacement of thousands of legacy routes and procedures with satellite-enabled RNAV and RNP methods—guidance that allowed aircraft to fly not toward a ground signal, but toward a destination defined in space. The benefits were immediate: reductions in fuel burn, emissions, and flight time; improvements in safety, predictability, and airspace capacity.

As of January 15, 2025, the FAA had published 10,009 PBN procedures and 470 PBN routes. These consist of RNAV standard instrument departures, T-Routes (1,200 feet above the surface to 18,000 feet of altitude), Q-Routes (18,000–45,000 feet of altitude), RNAV standard terminal arrivals (STAR), RNAV (GPS) approaches, and RNP approaches. Of the airports that publish instrument approach procedures, 96 percent publish PBN approach procedures and 31 percent use only PBN approach procedures.

RNAV STAR procedures can provide a continuous descent approach, also known as an optimized profile descent, from cruising altitude to save fuel, reduce emissions, and lower noise. The FAA has published RNAV STAR procedures at 128 airports with this capability that enable aircraft to fly closer to the airport at a more fuel-efficient altitude before descending. From the top of the descent to landing, the aircraft has minimal level-off segments, and pilots can avoid using speed brakes and frequently adjusting the thrust lever, which also save fuel. These procedures can be flown when available and when pilots are allowed to use them.

Using the Wide Area Augmentation System, instrument-rated pilots can land using GPS at airports where it was previously impossible. WAAS enhances the accuracy and integrity of position estimates. At an airport where a ground-based Instrument Landing System (ILS) may be out of service, PBN approach procedures serve as a backup. The FAA will seldom, if ever, install a new ILS, opting instead for PBN approach procedures, which save money. More than 150,000 aircraft in the NAS are equipped with WAAS, and more than 4,900 published WAAS procedures serve approximately 2,500 airports.

But even as PBN reshaped the navigational structure of the NAS, NextGen worked to ensure resilience. Recognizing that GPS signals can be vulnerable to interference or degradation, the FAA developed the NextGen distance measuring equipment (DME) Program, a targeted effort to reinforce navigation infrastructure with strategically placed and upgraded Distance Measuring Equipment. En route and terminal DMEs are undergoing significant upgrades, including frequency changes and enhancements to Standard Service Volume (SSV). Several new DMEs have/will be installed to address gaps in signal coverage, and provide redundancy in areas where satellite signals may be unreliable. These upgrades ensure that aircraft with DME capabilities can continue flying PBN routes in the event of satellite disruptions, preserving system performance while easing pilot and controller workload. The goal was not to return to legacy dependence, but to build a layered, resilient architecture: one where satellite precision is primary, but terrestrial systems provide vital support when needed. While some DMEs will be decommissioned, deployment and upgrades of all stations is scheduled to be completed in 2035. The VOR minimum operational network and NextGen distance measuring equipment (DME) will provide navigation resiliency.

In response to recommendations from the aviation community through RTCA's NextGen Mid-Term Implementation Task Force, the FAA began integrating PBN procedures to improve air traffic flow for 11 metroplexes, which are metropolitan areas where crowded airspace serve the needs of multiple airports. Through collaboration with the NextGen Advisory Committee, the FAA completed its projects at Atlanta, Charlotte, Cleveland-Detroit, Denver, Houston, Las Vegas, Northern California, North Texas, South Central Florida, Southern California, and Washington, D.C. Additionally, the FAA redesigned airspace incorporating PBN for 29 busy airports not meeting Metroplex program criteria.

PBN procedures also reduced oceanic separation standards laterally and longitudinally from 100 to 30 nautical miles. PBN improved lateral separation standards for approaches at airports with closely spaced parallel runways from 4,300 feet to 3,600 feet in 2013, and an equivalent lateral spacing operations standard enabled through PBN gives flexibility at some airports to handle more departures.

A rule change in 2015 allowed pilots to use a PBN approach procedure to take a shorter path to the runway more frequently. Aircraft can safely and efficiently land during simultaneous operations at certain airports with parallel runways without receiving directions from air traffic controllers monitoring them on radar. The FAA implemented a national standard in 2016 for this capability, which is known as Established on RNP. EoR is in use at Denver International Airport, George Bush Intercontinental Airport in Houston, and Los Angeles International Airport.

Multiple Airport Route Separation (MARS) is a related multi-airport project as it extends the EoR concept from runways at a single airport to runways at airports close to each other. MARS will enable expanded use of RNP and new access to airports and runway configurations. It is expected to provide similar benefits and increase the airports’ throughput. In 2026, the FAA plans on beginning operations at the first site after validating the concept and determining that it is safe.

The FAA aims for PBN to be used as a basis for daily operations throughout the National Airspace System, employing the appropriate procedure to meet the need. In some cases — as with metroplexes — this will include a highly structured, yet flexible, navigation pattern.

=== Surveillance ===
Automatic Dependent Surveillance–Broadcast (ADS-B) is a technology that brings a major change to flight tracking. Instead of using ground-based radar to receive aircraft position, speed, and direction every five to 12 seconds, aircraft equipped with newer GPS transponders determine this information and automatically send it once per second to air traffic control. ADS-B depends on an accurate satellite signal for position data. It is always broadcasting and requires no operator intervention. For the first time, pilots and air traffic controllers can see the same real-time display of air traffic, which improves situational awareness for improved safety.

The FAA completed installation of new ground radio infrastructure in 2014, and coverage is available in all 50 states, Guam, Puerto Rico, the Gulf of Mexico, and area off both coasts. Integration of ADS-B into en route and terminal automation platforms was completed in 2019. Aircraft flying in a large portion of controlled airspace have been required to be equipped for ADS-B Out since January 1, 2020.

Even with the capabilities offered by ADS-B through satellite technology, surveillance radar is still relevant and will be used as a supplement and ultimately as backup to ADS-B in the event of service disruption.

As of 2025, ADS-B infrastructure and equipage are mature and operational throughout the majority of controlled airspace. However, NextGen’s surveillance modernization did not end with deployment of controller tools. The program also set out to evaluate how this new data environment could enable next-generation flight deck surveillance and spacing capabilities; capabilities that go beyond pilot vision to enable tactical decision-making in the cockpit.

Through the ADS-B IN RETROFIT SPACING INITIATIVE (AIRS), the FAA began operational evaluation of three advanced cockpit applications: Cockpit Display of Traffic Information (CDTI)-Assisted Visual Separation (CAVS), CDTI-Assisted Separation on Approach (CAS-A), and Initial Interval Management (I-IM). These applications are designed to improve spacing precision and increase throughput on arrival and approach, especially in congested airspace.

In partnership with American Airlines and Aviation Communications & Surveillance Systems, the FAA launched operational trials beginning in 2021. The CAVS benefit report was completed in 2022, and the capability continues to be used operationally.

==== ADS-B Out ====
With ADS-B Out, surveillance coverage increases because ground stations can be placed where obstructions or physical limitations don't allow radar. Future intended time and position of aircraft are more accurate for optimal flight and traffic flow. Airlines that fly routes over the Gulf of Mexico or offshore routes without radar coverage can use ADS-B to follow more-efficient routes and be diverted less often due to weather.

At the nation's busiest airports, ADS-B Out is part of Airport Surface Detection Equipment–Model X at 35 sites and Airport Surface Surveillance Capability at nine sites. Controllers can track the surface movement of aircraft and airport ground vehicles, which helps reduce the risk of taxiway conflicts and runway incursions. A software enhancement for these two capabilities called Airport Taxi Arrival Prediction was added to warn air traffic controllers when pilots are lined up to land on a taxiway instead of their assigned runway. To further expand surface surveillance using ADS-B Out, 18 airports without either of these systems are getting the Surface Awareness Initiative system.

Another ground-based surveillance system that uses ADS-B is Wide Area Multilateration (WAM), which can be installed in locations where radar is limited or can't be used. It operates at many airports in the Colorado mountains; Juneau, Alaska; Charlotte, N.C.; and Southern California Terminal Radar Approach Control facility. Additional WAM services are planned for the Atlanta and New York metropolitan areas.

Because of the more frequent position update and coverage in areas without radar, ADS-B Out helps in performing life-saving search and rescue missions.

==== ADS-B In ====
Operators who choose to equip their aircraft to receive ADS-B signals for ADS-B In can gain many other benefits and is where the industry gains the most value for investing in ADS-B Out.

Traffic Information Services-Broadcast is a free service for pilots sending relevant traffic position reports to appropriately equipped aircraft to enhance safety. Flight Information Services-Broadcast is another free service delivering aeronautical and weather information to pilots to increase safety and efficiency.

ADS-B Traffic Awareness System offers general aviation aircraft a low-cost alerting capability to prevent aircraft collisions. The more advanced Airborne Collision Avoidance System X will support access to closely spaced runways in almost all weather conditions, flight deck interval management (IM), and separation similar to traditional visual operations with fewer nuisance alerts. The FAA anticipates ACAS X will replace the Traffic Alert and Collision Avoidance System.

In-Trail Procedures (ITP) reduce separation between aircraft during oceanic flights and is allowed for ITP-equipped aircraft in all oceanic airspace managed by Anchorage, New York, and Oakland en route centers. ADS-B-equipped aircraft with ITP software can fly more often at more fuel-efficient or less-turbulent flight levels. Equipment standards are complete and ready for manufacturers to produce the necessary avionics.

The FAA is developing IM applications that use ADS-B In to sequence and space aircraft pairs. IM's precise spacing enables more-efficient flight paths in congested airspace and maximizes airspace and airport use. Enhanced air traffic control capabilities for closely spaced parallel runway approach operations may also be assisted by ADS-B In that is integrated with the terminal automation system.

The first ground-based phase began operating at the Albuquerque Air Route Traffic Control Center in 2014. In 2017, the FAA supported a NASA evaluation of prototype avionics and procedures. The FAA sponsored a demonstration of IM operations using prototype avionics on closely spaced parallel runways at San Francisco International Airport in 2019. These flight demonstrations showed precise spacing is possible in real-world environments. The FAA completed the IM standards, and manufacturers can produce the necessary avionics.

The FAA worked with American Airlines and ACSS to install ADS-B In avionics that enable IM on the airline's fleet of Airbus A321 aircraft. The avionics enabled initial IM operations in Albuquerque en route airspace starting in 2022. Operations will be used to gather benefits data to share with the aviation community to motivate other air carriers to equip for ADS-B In.

Another application is Cockpit Display of Traffic Information (CDTI) Assisted Visual Separation (CAVS), which is used by air carriers to enhance traffic situational awareness. It allows a flight crew to continue a visual landing procedure using the electronic display to maintain separation if the pilot loses sight of traffic because of reduced visibility. It is expected to reduce go-arounds due to traffic flying too close on the final approach, which saves time and distance flown. Standards are complete and ready for manufacturers to produce the necessary avionics.

CDTI-Assisted Separation on Approach (CAS-A) is third type of application that uses ADS-B In. It is similar to CAVS except that pilots don't need to see the aircraft ahead through the window. Pilots also can continue flying at lower ceiling thresholds and with reduced spacing along the approach path during certain weather conditions to enable higher throughput.

As with IM, CAVS and CAS-A were installed on the American Airlines fleet of Airbus A321 aircraft, and the airline plans on sharing its data with the aviation community. The airline started operating CAVS in May 2021. A fourth application the airline has tested will help to avoid wake turbulence. The vertical path indicator gives in-trail pilots the lead aircraft’s vertical path via an ADS-B guidance display. Through the testing of ADS-B In capabilities, American Airlines is interested in equipping more of its aircraft for ADS-B In.

Although it can be used without it, a NASA-developed application called Traffic Aware Strategic Aircrew Requests (TASAR) could benefit from aircraft equipped with ADS-B In. TASAR suggests a new route or altitude change to save time or fuel, and ADS-B In can assist by enabling the software to determine what requests will likely be approved by air traffic control due to nearby traffic. A NASA study of Alaska Airlines flights projected that the airline would save more than 1 million gallons of fuel, more than 110,000 minutes of flight time, and $5.2 million annually.

=== Automation ===
==== Air Traffic Control Computer Stations ====
En route automation drives display screens used by air traffic controllers to safely manage and separate aircraft at cruising altitudes. Terminal automation is for controllers to manage air traffic immediately around major airports. It is used for separating and sequencing of aircraft, conflict and terrain avoidance alerts, weather advisories, and radar vectoring for departing and arriving traffic.

The FAA's En Route Automation Modernization (ERAM) platform replaced the legacy Host system for en route air traffic control in 2015. A sustainment and enhancement program is in progress and scheduled to be completed in 2026. En route controllers can now track as many as 1,900 aircraft at a time, up from the previous 1,100 limit. Coverage extends beyond facility boundaries, enabling controllers to handle traffic more efficiently. This coverage is possible because ERAM can process data from 64 radars versus 24.

For pilots, ERAM increases flexible routing around congestion, weather, and other restrictions. Real-time air traffic management and information sharing on flight restrictions improves airlines' ability to plan flights with minimal changes. Reduced vectoring and increased radar coverage leads to smoother, faster, and more cost-efficient flights.

Trajectory modeling is more accurate, allowing maximum airspace use, better conflict detection, and improved decision-making. Two functionally identical channels with dual redundancy eliminate a single point of failure. ERAM also provides a user-friendly interface with customizable displays. It revolutionizes controller training with a realistic, high-fidelity system that challenges developmental practices with complex approaches, maneuvers, and simulated pilot scenarios that were unavailable with Host.

The Terminal Automation Modernization and Replacement program's Standard Terminal Automation Replacement System (STARS) replaced the legacy Automated Radar Terminal System. Installation was completed in 2021, and it is operating at more than 200 FAA and Department of Defense (DoD) terminal radar approach control facilities, and more than 600 FAA and DoD air traffic control tower facilities.

STARS maintains safety while increasing cost-effectiveness at terminal facilities across the National Airspace System. It provides advanced features and functionalities for controllers, such as a state-of-the-art flat-panel LED display and the ability to save controller workstation preferences. It is also easier for technicians to maintain. Approach Runway Verification is a STARS function giving air traffic controllers visual and audible alerts if an aircraft on arrival is lined up with the wrong runway, a closed runway, a taxiway, or wrong airport. At 50 facilities as of 2025, the FAA intends to bring this capability to every facility with STARS.

Although ERAM and STARS are not NextGen programs themselves, they lay the foundation to enable critical NextGen capabilities in terminal and en route airspace.

==== Traffic Flow Decision Support Systems ====
These FAA Decision Support Systems (DSS) are used by air traffic controllers to optimize traffic flow across the National Airspace System (NAS) and are central to the FAA's goal of trajectory-based operations:

- Traffic Flow Management System (TFMS)
- Time Based Flow Management (TBFM)
- Terminal Flight Data Manager (TFDM)

Traffic Flow Management System (TFMS) is the primary automation system used by the Air Traffic Control System Command Center and nationwide traffic management units to regulate air traffic flow, manage throughput, and plan for future air traffic demand. TFMS's 31 tools exchange information and support other DSS through System Wide Information Management (SWIM). The FAA deployed a TFMS software refresh to 82 sites in 2016 and completed a hardware refresh at those sites in 2018. The FAA continues to develop future concepts for TFMS modeling and predicting capabilities. In the 2024 NextGen report, Flow Management Data and Services (FMDS) is planned to fully replace TFMS in 2031. FMDS is expected to consolidate data, increase data sharing, and improve scalability.

TBFM allows traffic management units to schedule and optimize the arrival load for major airports. It is operational at 20 en route centers, 28 terminal radar approach control facilities (TRACON), and 54 airport towers. Its tools, such as extended metering and integrated departure arrival capability, help controllers sequence traffic with time instead of distance. Performance Based Navigation route and procedure data help improve predicted arrival times. The integrated departure arrival capability tool deployed to the sixth and final site in June 2022.

One future TBFM tool, terminal sequencing and spacing, will lengthen metering capability into terminal airspace. It was developed by NASA and delivered to the FAA in 2014. Another capability in development is machine learning trajectory prediction used to project aircraft location by using aircraft performance models. Through 2027, TBFM will be upgraded to meet security requirements. A sustainment project is underway to upgrade the hardware and software.

In 2016, the FAA awarded Lockheed Martin a $344 million contract to develop and deploy TFDM, which is a new system for surface management. It supports decision-making on the airport ground by integrating flight, surface surveillance, and traffic management information using SWIM. TFDM tools consist of electronic flight progress strips, departure queue management, surface management, and surface situational awareness. Implementation of electronic flight data and the integration of TBFM and TFMS through SWIM will enable TFDM to consolidate some previously independent systems.

The FAA started early implementation of the Surface Visualization Tool in 2014 and electronic flight strips in 2015. The FAA and NASA in 2021 finished research and testing on a surface scheduling capability that calculates gate pushbacks at busy hub airports so that each airplane can roll directly to the runway and take off. TFDM will be deployed in two configurations. Configuration A has full functionality, and Charlotte began operating in May 2024, the first of 27 large, high-density airports. Configuration B has improved electronic flight data and electronic flight strips. Cleveland began operating with these capabilities in October 2022. Another 21 sites are scheduled to receive this configuration. Deployment at all locations is planned for completion in July 2029.

==== Advanced Technologies and Oceanic Procedures ====
Advanced Technologies and Oceanic Procedures (ATOP) replaced existing oceanic air traffic control systems and procedures. ATOP fully integrates flight and radar data processing, detects conflicts between aircraft, provides satellite data link communications and surveillance, eliminates paper flight strips, and automates manual processes.

ATOP fully modernizes oceanic air traffic control automation and allows flight operators to take further advantage of investments in cockpit digital communications. The FAA reduces intensive manual processes that limit controllers' ability to safely handle airline requests for more efficient tracks or altitudes over long oceanic routes. The FAA can meet international commitments of reducing aircraft separation standards, which increase flight capacity and efficiency.

ATOP is used at all three oceanic en route traffic control centers, which are in Anchorage, New York, and Oakland. After the first technology refresh in 2009, ATOP's second refresh was completed at these centers in 2020, which is intended to support the system through 2028. An enhancement program started in 2018 comprises five large-scale capabilities. Deployment began in 2021 and is set to be complete in 2025. These changes are intended to optimize flight trajectories, decrease controller workload, reduce costs, and improve system safety.

=== Information Management ===
==== System Wide Information Management ====
The FAA traditionally shared information using a variety of technologies, including radio, telephone, Internet, and dedicated virtual private network connections. However, the agency leveraged new information management technologies to improve information delivery and content. In 2007, the FAA established the SWIM program to implement a set of information technology principles in the National Airspace System (NAS) and provide users with relevant and commonly understandable information. SWIM facilitates NextGen's data-sharing requirements, serving as the digital data-sharing backbone of the NAS.

This platform offers a single point of access for aeronautical, flight, surveillance, and weather data. Producers can publish data once, and approved consumers can access needed information through a single connection instead of linking two systems with fixed network connections and custom point-to-point application-level data interfaces. The format supports collaboration within domestic and international aviation communities.

In 2015, the SWIM program completed its first segment, which established a common infrastructure and connection points at all en route traffic control centers. The program's second segment started in 2016. It established a service-oriented architecture—composed of producers, consumers, and a registry—and connected NAS programs, such as the Traffic Flow Management System, to provide large data sources for consumers. Several enhancements were later deployed—enterprise service monitoring, identity and access management, NAS common reference service, SWIM Terminal Data Distribution System, and SWIM Flight Data Publication Service—and SWIM continues to add NAS air traffic management content providers and consumers. The FAA is working on software and hardware enhancements as well as technology refreshments to keep up with an expanding information environment.

As of 2024, 51 FAA programs and external organizations, including airlines, produce data for more than 200 services via the SWIM network. Of the more than 800 registered consumers, about 400 are regular users. The SWIM Cloud Distribution Service (SCDS) was established in 2019 to simplify how users can gain access to non-sensitive NAS information. In 2021, the SWIM Industry-FAA Team (SWIFT) portal started, which updates and enhances the SCDS. SWIFT and a user forum are two resources where individuals and organizations can learn more about SWIM.

SWIM reduces costs, can increase operational efficiency, and opens the possibility of creating new services for the aviation community. Data sharing among pilots, flight operations personnel, controllers, and air traffic managers is essential to achieving a NextGen objective of trajectory-based operations.

Airlines and airports have reported using FAA data to improve operations. The most extensive use of SWIM data was supporting improved awareness of operating conditions and flight status, especially on the airport surface and in situations when aircraft transition from contact with one air traffic control center to the next. Connected aircraft is a concept to deliver high-performance communications in future operations by using commercial broadband internet services instead of aviation-specific infrastructure. Aircraft will be able to access SWIM data for improved decision-making.

The most dynamic use of real-time surveillance data outside the FAA may be providing flight-tracking services to the flying public and aviation businesses. Through web browsers and mobile apps, service subscribers can access current information about flight and airport status and delays.

==== Aeronautical Mobile Airport Communication System ====
Transmission of information necessary to conduct efficient airport surface operations in the years ahead will be possible with the Aeronautical Mobile Airport Communication System (AeroMACS). The system uses wireless broadband technology that supports the increasing need for data communications and information sharing on the airport surface for fixed and mobile applications now and into the future.

Besides improved capacity, aging airport communications infrastructure requires more extensive and expensive monitoring, maintenance, repair, or replacement. Airport construction and unexpected equipment outages also require temporary communications alternatives, and AeroMACS also could serve as a backup. The system was implemented in 2017 under the FAA Airport Surface Surveillance Capability program. As of December 2020, more than 50 airports in nearly 15 countries are using AeroMACS. It could take up to 20 years to deploy the technology to more than 40,000 airports worldwide.

=== Weather ===
The FAA's NextGen Weather program provides aviation weather products that support air traffic management during weather events, helping to improve aviation safety and minimize passenger delays. The largest cause of National Airspace System (NAS) air traffic delays is weather, which was responsible for 75 percent of system-impacting delays of more than 15 minutes from June 2017 to May 2023. With more accurate and timely weather predictions, airports and airlines could prevent as many as two-thirds of weather-related delays and cancellations.

Aviation weather is composed of information observation, processing, and dissemination. NextGen weather systems consist of the NextGen Weather Processor (NWP) to generate advanced aviation-specific weather products and Common Support Services– Weather (CSS-Wx) for dissemination of these products. Both started operating at the national enterprise management centers in Atlanta and Salt Lake City in 2024, and full deployment is scheduled to be completed in 2025. Five en route centers and the Potomac TRACON are getting the NWP. Aviation weather displays will be located at the Air Traffic Control System Command Center, 21 en route centers, three center radar approach control (CERAP) facilities, and 45 TRACONs. The William J. Hughes Technical Center will receive a NWP external web server via the internet for non-FAA users of the aviation weather display. CSS-Wx will be available at 21 en route centers and three CERAPs.

The NWP program established a common weather processing platform to replace the legacy FAA weather processor systems and offers new capabilities. The fully automated NWP identifies safety hazards around airports and in cruising altitude airspace. It supports strategic traffic flow management, including the translated weather information needed to predict route blockage and airspace capacity constraints up to 8 hours in advance. NWP uses advanced algorithms to create current and predicted aviation-specific weather information with data from the FAA and National Oceanic and Atmospheric Administration (NOAA) radar and sensors, and NOAA forecast models. Part of the NWP, the Aviation Weather Display consolidates the current Weather and Radar Processor, Integrated Terminal Weather System, and the Corridor Integrated Weather System displays. The Aviation Weather Display provides consistent weather information at a glance for en route and terminal controllers, and includes NWP and NOAA weather products.

CSS-Wx is the single producer of weather data, products, and imagery within the NAS, using standards-based weather dissemination via SWIM. It consolidates and enables the decommissioning of legacy weather dissemination systems. It also offers NWP and NOAA weather products, and other weather sources for integration into air traffic decision support systems, improving the quality of traffic management decisions and enhancing controller productivity during severe weather. CSS-Wx information consumers include air traffic controllers and managers, commercial and general aviation operators, and the flying public.

The FAA's Weather Technology in the Cockpit team of researchers are experts on the pitfalls of how weather is displayed in general aviation cockpits. Their main research goal is to encourage improvements in how meteorological information is shown to pilots so they can consistently and accurately interpret that information, understand its limitations, and use it to avoid bad weather.

=== Multiple Runway Operations and Separation Management ===
Efficiency of multiple runway operations (MRO), particularly those that are closely spaced, has been limited by safety risks, including collisions and wake turbulence with nearby aircraft. MRO advancements improve access to closely spaced parallel runways to enable more departure and arrival operations during instrument meteorological conditions, which increase efficiency and capacity while reducing flight delays. The advancements enable the use of simultaneous approaches in low-visibility conditions, decrease separation for approaches to runways with stricter spacing requirements, and reduce the effects of wake turbulence that leads to increased separation.

Revised wake separation standards, known as wake recategorization or wake recat, have been reduced at terminal radar approach control (TRACON) facilities and airports across the United States. Phase 1 of wake recat replaced a weight-based standard with new size categories more optimally based on aircraft wake turbulence characteristics. Phase 1.5 refined Phase 1 with further reductions to separation. These phases were implemented at 31 airports.

Phase 2 defined pairwise wake turbulence separation standards among 123 aircraft types that make up 99 percent of global operations at 32 U.S. airports. Air traffic control operations then can implement customized wake turbulence categories optimized to maximize the benefit for an airport fleet. With these changes, airports experienced as high as an average 10 percent increase in throughput, enabling more aircraft to take off and land with shorter wait times on taxiways and runways. At Indianapolis, airlines save more than $2 million per year in operational costs with wake recat. At Philadelphia, airlines save about $800,000 per year.

Consolidated wake turbulence (CWT) aimed to use the best set of separation standards derived from these phases. The FAA finished converting legacy standards from the two phases into CWT standards at 19 TRACON facilities in 2022. The final phase is to develop dynamic wake separation enhancements for decision support systems taking wind into account. A total wind dynamic wake separation enhancement will give terminal area controllers a suite of decision support tools expected to increase airport throughput by an estimated 5 percent to 10 percent beyond what was already accomplished by the Phase II-based static wake separation standards.

The FAA continues to evaluate procedures at airports with closely spaced parallel runways with simultaneous approaches and departures. With independent runways, aircraft can pass aircraft approaching the parallel runway next to them while dependent runways require pilots to maintain a diagonal separation.

After determining that lateral runway separation can be safely reduced, the FAA revised the separation standard from 4,300 feet to 3,600 feet for independent arrivals in August 2013. Dual independent parallel operations started operating in Atlanta in 2014. Dual independent parallel operations with offset started operating in Detroit in 2015 and at Chicago-O'Hare in 2016. Triple independent parallel operations started in Atlanta and Washington-Dulles in 2017. Further revisions to closely spaced parallel operations were included in the November 2015 update to FAA Order 7110.65, Air Traffic Control. The revisions reduce lateral separation requirements to as close as 3,900 feet for triple independent approaches, and 3,000 feet for offset dual independent approaches without requiring high-update-rate radar or Automatic Dependent Surveillance–Broadcast.

Dependent parallel operations at 1 nm for runways less than 2,500 feet to 3,600 feet apart began operations at Dallas-Love Field, Memphis, Minneapolis-St. Paul, New York-JFK, Portland, Raleigh-Durham, and Seattle in 2016, and in San Francisco in 2017. Dependent parallel operations for runways more than 3,600 feet apart started operating at Cincinnati/Northern Kentucky, Louisville, Memphis, and Phoenix in 2017. For dual-dependent approaches, the runway spacing requirement remains 2,500 feet, but the diagonal spacing was reduced from 1.5 nautical miles (nm) to 1 nm. In 2018, FAA Order 7110.308C identified specific airports—Boston, Cleveland, Memphis, Newark, Philadelphia, Seattle, San Francisco, and St. Louis—with runways spaced less than 2,500 feet apart that can reduce diagonal spacing between aircraft on parallel approaches from 1.5 nm to 1 nm.

The Converging Runway Display Aid is an automation tool used by air traffic controllers to manage the sequence of arrival flows on converging or intersecting runways. It is operational at Boston, Chicago O'Hare, Denver, Las Vegas, Memphis, Minneapolis-St. Paul, Newark, Phoenix, and Philadelphia, and enhances an airport's throughput under certain conditions.

A separation efficiency tool called Automated Terminal Proximity Alert was first implemented at Minneapolis-St. Paul in May 2011 and now is deployed at 14 TRACON facilities across the country. It better informs air traffic controllers of gaps so they can tell pilots to adjust their speed or direct them to a shorter path to the runway. During its first year of use, the number of go-arounds declined by 23 percent for flights headed to Minneapolis-St. Paul. Excess flight time due to a go-around decreased by 19 percent.

=== Improved Approaches and Low-Visibility Operations ===
The FAA supports several optional capabilities for operators who need to access an airport when the cloud ceiling is less than 200 feet above the runway or visibility is less than a half mile. They help to achieve NextGen goals of safely increasing access, efficiency, and throughput at many airports when low visibility is the limiting factor. For instance, after a reduction of minimum visual runway range requirements, an FAA assessment showed airport access during low-visibility conditions improved in two ways: almost 6 percent fewer periods with no access and 17 percent more flights could land.

Head-up displays (HUD) were approved to use on a precision approach to lower minimum decision heights to land. Use of a qualified HUD when flying to a suitable Instrument Landing System facility reduces the required runway visual range visibility for approach.

The FAA allows the use of an enhanced flight vision system (EFVS) instead of natural vision to conduct an instrument landing procedure in low-visibility conditions. EFVS uses sensor technologies to give pilots a clear, real-time virtual image of the view outside the aircraft, regardless of the cloud cover and visibility conditions. Pilots can identify required visual references that would be impossible without it. It provides access that otherwise would be denied because of low visibility. A synthetic vision guidance system combines flight guidance display technology with high-precision position assurance monitors to continuously and correctly depict the external scene and runway. It can assist a pilot's transition to natural vision references.

Enhanced Low Visibility Operations (ELVO) was a low-cost infrastructure program to reduce minimum ceilings and runway visual range through a combination of ground equipment and navigation procedures. Most ELVO improvements resulted from FAA Order 8400.13. The Ground Based Augmentation System Landing System (GBAS) uses GPS navigation to support all precision-approach categories. Newark Liberty International Airport and Houston's George Bush Intercontinental Airport operate non-federal GBAS systems approved for operations to as low as 200 feet above the runway.

=== Remote Towers ===
Remote tower technology may enable controlled air traffic for small airports without a physical tower or that need to replace an aging tower. Controllers from the remote site may monitor and separate traffic by viewing the scene at the airport equipped with a panoramic color video cameras with pan-tilt-zoom and night vision features. Automated identification and relevant aircraft information may also be displayed on video monitors.

At Leesburg Executive Airport in Virginia, the FAA had authorized air traffic control services to use this system as a test site until the vendor decided to end the project in 2023. Testing at the other tower at the Northern Colorado Regional Airport near Fort Collins/Loveland has been paused. The FAA continues to evaluate remote tower technology as a potentially cost-effective alternative to traditional federal contract towers. The agency completed construction of a test bed at the William J. Hughes Technical Center and Atlantic City International Airport in 2024 to better understand the full capabilities of a remote tower system.

=== Energy and Environment ===
The FAA's environmental vision is to develop and operate a system that protects the environment while allowing for sustained aviation growth. The FAA Office of Environment and Energy Research and Development is working to reduce air and water pollution, carbon dioxide emissions that may affect climate, and noise that can disturb residents near airports. Airframe and aircraft engine technology, alternative fuels, air traffic management modernization and operational improvements, improved scientific knowledge and integrated modeling, and policies, environmental standards, and market-based measures will contribute toward meeting almost all of these goals. Noise and emissions will be the main environmental problems for National Airspace System (NAS) capacity and flexibility unless they are effectively managed and mitigated.

An FAA study conducted in 2015 showed that since 1975, the number of people flying in the United States increased from about 200 million to an estimated 800 million, yet the number of people exposed to significant aircraft noise had dropped from about 7 million to nearly 340,000. Even with this decrease, community concern regarding aircraft noise is climbing. The FAA aims to minimize the impact of noise on residential areas without compromising safety. The agency's goal was to reduce the number of people around airports exposed to a day-night average aircraft sound level of 65 decibels to less than 300,000 by 2018. One way the agency planned to achieve it was by adopting a new noise standard for certain newly certificated subsonic jet airplanes and subsonic transport category large airplanes.

The FAA's neighborhood environment survey, the largest of its kind, about aircraft noise exposure and its effects on communities around airports was completed in 2016. The results showed that considerably more people are upset by aircraft noise regardless of the level. The FAA will use those results and other research underway to re-evaluate criteria to define significance under the National Environmental Policy Act and federal land use guidelines. In addition, the FAA has researched other affected areas, such as sleep disturbance, cardiovascular health, and children's learning. The FAA also is examining the potential noise effects of new aircraft in the NAS, such as drones and supersonic jets.

The Continuous Lower Energy, Emissions, and Noise (CLEEN) program is a public-private partnership under NextGen to accelerate development and commercial deployment of more-efficient technologies and sustainable alternative fuels. The first five-year agreement with manufacturers from 2010 to 2015 produced jet engine, wing, and aerodynamic technologies; automation and flight management systems; fuels; and materials. One result of this effort is General Electric's Twin Annular Premixing Swirler II Combustor, which reduces nitrogen oxide emissions by more than 60 percent compared to the International Civil Aviation Organization (ICAO) nitrogen oxide standard adopted in 2004. A second five-year agreement started in 2015 aimed to lower cumulative noise levels, reduce fuel consumption, cut nitrogen oxide emissions, and speed commercialization of alternative jet fuels.

Both phases are estimated to lower the aviation industry consumption of fuel by 51.1 billion gallons through 2050, reducing airline costs by $200 billion, and cut carbon dioxide emissions by 500 million metric tons. Another potential benefit is a 10 percent reduction in the noise contour area by 2050.

A third five-year phase of CLEEN started in 2021. The FAA awarded more than $100 million for six companies to help develop technologies that reduce fuel use, emissions, and noise. Goals are to reduce carbon dioxide emissions by improving fuel efficiency by at least 20 percent below the relevant ICAO standard, drop nitrogen oxide emissions by 70 percent relative to the most recent ICAO standard, lower particulate matter emissions below the ICAO standard, and slash noise by 25 dB cumulative relative to the FAA Stage 5 standard.

Since 2009, ASTM International approved five ways of producing sustainable alternative jet fuel that requires no modification to aircraft or engines, and more are being developed, tested, and evaluated. The FAA's efforts helped United Airlines use an alternative jet fuel made from hydroprocessed esters and fatty acids for its daily operations at Los Angeles starting in 2016. The airline in 2021 flew a Boeing 737 Max 8 with one of its engines running on 100 percent alternative aviation fuel. The near-term goal is to produce 3 billion gallons of sustainable alternative aviation fuel by 2030, and the ultimate goal is nearly 35 billion gallons by 2050, enough to meet the entire industry need.

More than 222,000 registered piston engine general aviation aircraft can operate with leaded aviation gasoline, the only remaining transportation fuel in the United States that contains lead. The FAA and Piston Aviation Fuels Initiative have been researching an acceptable unleaded fuel alternative. The FAA approved the first unleaded fuel that can be used for all piston engine aircraft September 1, 2022. The goal is to have only unleaded aviation fuel available by the end of 2030.

The FAA uses the Aviation Environmental Design Tool to assess the environmental effect of federal actions at airports as well as on air traffic, airspace, and aviation procedures. Along with other federal agencies and Transport Canada, the FAA funds the Aviation Sustainability Center, which is contributing to developing international aviation emission and noise standards. In 2016, the United States and 22 countries reached an agreement on a first-ever global aircraft carbon dioxide standard to encourage more fuel-efficient technologies to be integrated into aircraft designs. In 2020, the ICAO council adopted a new environmental measure of non-volatile particulate matter emissions. It replaces the 1970s-era "smoke number"—a figure that describes the visibility of emissions—with a much more accurate measure of emissions particles.

=== Safety ===
The FAA's safety program is guided by its Safety Management System—an agency-wide approach that directs the management of NextGen initiatives. NextGen capabilities must maintain safe operations in the National Airspace System (NAS), and the FAA has many processes to ensure that flying remains safe.

The interconnected nature of NextGen presents complicated safety challenges that call for an integrated path to safety risk management. Integrated safety risk management explores safety risk from a NAS enterprise framework to identify potential safety gaps inherent in NextGen capabilities. It identifies safety issues by assessing risk across organizational, system, and program boundaries, and relies on FAA-wide collaboration to capture the most relevant safety information to assist in decision-making.

Aviation watchdogs once measured safety by the number of accidents. Commercial aviation accidents eventually became so rare that the FAA began to measure potential precursors to accidents. Loss of a safe margin of separation between aircraft became the risk measure that the FAA tracked and reported. Proximity is a valid indicator, but is an incomplete picture and provides no insight into accidents' causal factors. System Safety Management is a NextGen portfolio of initiatives to develop and implement policies, processes, and analytical tools that the FAA and industry uses to ensure the safety of the NAS. The goal is to be certain that changes introduced with NextGen capabilities maintain or enhance safety while delivering capacity and efficiency benefits to NAS users.

Improved risk analysis processes and new safety intelligence tools help safety analysts go beyond examining past accident data to detecting risk and implementing strategies to prevent accidents. The System Safety Management Transformation program enables safety analyses to determine how NAS-wide operational improvements will affect safety and evaluate potential ways to reduce safety risk. It consists of three tools: Airport Surface Anomaly Investigation Capability, Integrated Safety Assessment Model, and Safety Information Toolkit for Analysis and Reporting.

Aviation Safety Information Analysis and Sharing (ASIAS) provides a platform for improvements to the safety performance measurement infrastructure. More than 260 stakeholders organizations provide data for analysis, including 45 airlines. ASIAS has grown to involve other operators since its charter in 2007.

The Commercial Aviation Safety Team (CAST), composed of airlines, manufacturers, industry association regulators, labor unions, and air traffic controllers, helped reduce the fatality risk for commercial aviation in the United States by 83 percent from 1998 to 2007. With the help of these new initiatives, the team's latest goal is to further lower the U.S. commercial fatality risk by 50 percent from 2010 to 2025. The CAST plan comprises 96 enhancements aimed at improving safety across a wide variety of operations.

== Stakeholder Collaboration ==
NextGen modernization involved the FAA workforce and industry, interagency, and international partnerships. The FAA strengthened relationships with its workforce and labor union partners to ensure that everyone had the skills necessary to run the future National Airspace System (NAS).

Training evolved to make sure that the NAS workforce understands—and took ownership of—the changing operational concepts and their effects on how services were provided. Recurrent air traffic control training will need to evolve from a focus on automation manipulation to one that ensures all participants in the NAS understand the changing operational concepts and their implications for how services are provided. The process requires the engagement and ownership of the entire aviation workforce, including pilots, controllers, inspectors, regulators, engineers, technicians, and program managers. The FAA is focused on providing its labor force with the leadership, technical, and functional skills to safely and productively transition and manage the needs of the future NAS. This transformation includes leadership development, skills identification and development, and attracting talent.

Through the NextGen Advisory Committee (NAC), the FAA and industry have collaborated to identify and deliver the capabilities that matter most to customers. The FAA formed the NAC in 2010 to work with industry stakeholders, set priorities, and deliver benefits. Led by airline executives and others from the aviation community with an intimate understanding of shared challenges and opportunities, the NAC conducts its business in public so that deliberations and findings are transparent.

In 2014, the NAC developed a joint 3-year implementation plan for delivering new capabilities with near-term benefits to airports across the country. The process of developing and monitoring this plan provided all parties with a better understanding about planning decisions and has bolstered trust and cooperation among all parties. This collaborative plan, delivered to Congress in October 2014 and updated annually since then, outlines milestones for delivering benefits in a 1- to 3-year timeframe. The first high-readiness capabilities were improvements in Data Communications, Performance Based Navigation, improved multiple runway operations, and surface operations. At the end of fiscal year 2017, the FAA had completed 157 commitments in these areas. A fifth focus area, Northeast Corridor, was established in 2017 to improve operations in the airspace between Washington, D.C. and Boston. Commitments for all focus areas are found in the 2019-2021 joint implementation plan. From January 2019 through March 2020, the FAA completed 87 out of 88 commitments. Remaining milestone dates were extended past 2022 because of program delays related to the COVID-19 pandemic.

Besides the NAC, the Advanced Aviation Advisory Committee, established in 2018 as the Drone Advisory Committee, and the Research, Engineering, and Development Advisory Committee also bring federal involvement in airspace modernization. Beyond federal advisory committees, the FAA has partnerships with universities and industry through communities of interest and federally funded research and development centers.

The FAA established the Interagency Planning Office (IPO) in May 2014, and since then renamed the NextGen Stakeholder Advocacy and Outreach Branch, to coordinate actions across the federal government. The FAA works mainly with the Department of Transportation, National Transportation Safety Board, National Aeronautics and Space Administration, Department of Defense, Department of Homeland Security, Department of the Interior, Department of Commerce, and Advisory Council on Historic Preservation to share information and coordinate policy. Aviation cybersecurity, unmanned aircraft systems, and NextGen weather are some of the focus areas.

Engaging with the international aviation community through partnerships and regulatory harmonization is the foundation of the FAA's global leadership initiative. The NextGen International Branch focuses on coordinating and sharing information with global partners. Its ultimate goal is to support smooth interoperability and harmonization and to provide a mechanism to make air traffic management systems safer and more efficient for air navigation service providers and airspace users. The FAA has international agreements with the European Union, Japan, and Singapore for joint research and development of future air traffic systems. The NextGen International Branch also participates with the U.S. Trade Development Agency and Department of Commerce on their agreements with China, Brazil, and Indonesia.

In 2023, the FAA, Aeronautical Radio of Thailand, Civil Aviation Authority of Singapore, Japan Civil Aviation Bureau, and Boeing signed a declaration of intent on multi-regional trajectory-based operations (MR TBO), showing a commitment to realize TBO around the world. The FAA and its MR TBO partners also completed six-day live flight demonstration of MR TBO. This new way of managing airspace could lower fuel consumption and carbon emissions by as much as 10 percent.

== Accommodating other operations ==
The Vision 100—Century of Aviation Reauthorization Act in 2003 included the idea that all forms of aviation would be adapted into National Airspace System (NAS) modernization. As the growth of non-traditional forms of aviation has soared since then, the FAA has moved to accommodate new operators by developing traffic management concepts and evaluating technologies to safely incorporate unmanned aircraft systems, spacecraft, and other emerging aircraft into the NAS without disrupting existing traffic.

=== Unmanned aircraft systems ===
An unmanned aerial vehicle, commonly known as a drone, is flown by a pilot on the ground or autonomously. An unmanned aircraft system (UAS) includes the equipment—for example communications links to control the aircraft—necessary to safely and efficiently operate the aircraft. Unmanned aircraft are categorized into five groups by size, and they vary in takeoff weight, operating altitude, and speed. They have a variety of applications, including cargo and passenger transportation.

The FAA develops policies, procedures, and rulemaking with stakeholders to enable safe UAS operation. From the first FAA-issued airworthiness certificate for a civil unmanned aircraft in 2005 to the more recent accomplishment of approving commercial drone flights without visual observers in the Dallas-area airspace in 2024, the FAA reached different milestones toward integrating UAS into the National Airspace System (NAS) as the industry matured.

In 2013, the agency published the first edition of the Integration of Civil Unmanned Aircraft Systems in the National Airspace System Roadmap and approved UAS operations over people. The same year, the FAA announced the selection of these six public entities to develop UAS research and test sites: University of Alaska, State of Nevada, Griffiss International Airport in New York, North Dakota Department of Commerce, Texas A&M University, and Virginia Tech. Another FAA document to address accommodating the continuous growth in the scope of the NAS is the UAS Traffic Management Concept of Operations, which was first published in 2018 and updated in 2020.

The Drone Advisory Committee, later renamed the Advanced Aviation Advisory Committee, was established in 2018 to improve the safety and efficiency of integrating advanced aviation technologies into the NAS. It includes a range of aviation community stakeholders who provide independent advice and recommendations to the Department of Transportation and the FAA, and respond to FAA tasks.

=== Advanced air mobility ===
Advanced air mobility (AAM) is another non-traditional sector of the aerospace industry gaining momentum. In 2021, investment in AAM set a record at more than $7 billion. The market size was nearly $8 billion in 2022 and it may grow at a compounded annual rate of 24.6 percent from 2023 to 2035.

AAM is intended to safely and efficiently integrate highly or fully automated new aircraft into the NAS and the aviation ecosystem with or without a pilot aboard while cruising at altitudes between 2,000 and 5,000 feet mean sea level. These aircraft may fly people and cargo between places with limited or no air transportation service in urban, suburban, and regional areas. The FAA is in charge of certifying new technologies and aircraft being developed by industry along with the pilots who fly them. Infrastructure for takeoff and landing, types of NAS operations, and community engagement are other facets of FAA involvement.

Urban air mobility (UAM) is a category of AAM that covers mainly electric vertical takeoff and landing (eVTOL) aircraft serving in roles such as air taxis, air ambulances, and delivery vehicles of small goods in and around cities. Battery-powered motors in UAM aircraft can provide these services without the fuel consumption, exhaust emissions, and noise of turbine or piston engines in rotorcraft and fixed-wing aircraft.

The FAA published its first UAM Concept of Operations in 2020 and issued an update in 2023. The agency completed the initial conceptual systems architecture, technical evaluation plan, and operational variation analysis report in 2022. In 2023, the FAA signed an agreement with AFWERX, the U.S. Air Force technology incubator, in an effort to safely integrate AAM aircraft into the NAS.

In August 2022, the FAA set rules that will govern AAM operations. The agency issued a rule in October 2024 for the training and qualifications required for flight instructors and pilots to fly a new category of civil aircraft known as powered lift, which will accommodate AAM operations.

The first eVTOL commercial operations in the United States could start as early as the first quarter of 2027.

=== Operating environments ===
The UAS and AAM industries want to operate with remote pilots or no pilots through greater degrees of autonomy as the industries mature, and the FAA will evaluate these types of aircraft and related technologies. The FAA plans to enable more complex operations involving drones and AAM aircraft.

The integration of UAS into the NAS is evolving to where the pilot no longer must keep the aircraft within sight, which opens up the potential for remotely piloted operations. The FAA evaluated beyond visual line of sight operations for various drones heavier than 55 pounds flying above 400 feet and approved flight beyond visual line of sight for three companies in 2023, which opened new opportunities to drone operators as their aircraft can travel longer distances. Live-flight demonstrations will help to inform stakeholders on needs for communication, navigation, and surveillance services among users.

The FAA is developing a traffic management system using third-party suppliers of services for UAS, AAM, and aircraft in upper airspace to complement conventional FAA air traffic services. The goal is to have a fully integrated information environment throughout the NAS. How non-traditional aircraft operations are managed generally depends on how high they fly.

==== Ground level to 400 feet ====
Drones in airspace up to 400 feet above ground level can operate under UAS traffic management (UTM), where they meet established performance requirements and cooperatively separate through shared situational awareness. Crop monitoring, firefighting support, and short-distance package delivery are examples of the operations that could occur in this airspace not served by traditional air traffic services.

The FAA UTM integrated capabilities program establishes the concepts, requirements, and use cases associated with UTM and the flight information management system (FIMS) to safely manage UAS operations. This system works primarily through operator-to-operator and operator-to-FAA sharing of flight intent and airspace constraints.

FIMS provides the FAA with access to UTM data. It will support the increasing pace of UAS access to airspace and will eliminate the need for waivers. The program will also continue to develop ongoing standards to expand collision avoidance research and requirements for a new category of users in the UTM environment to ensure future systems interoperate within the NAS.

The FAA, NASA, and their partners demonstrated in 2019 how this kind of system can work in the future in a pilot program to form the foundation for a UAS traffic management system.

==== Up to 60,000 feet ====
In airspace up to 60,000 feet mean sea level (MSL), UAS receive traditional air traffic services where required. Up to 18,000 feet MSL, operators observe a mix of visual and instrument flight rules. Examples of uses in this airspace include emergency monitoring and inspection. At and above 18,000 feet MSL, UAS operations such as large cargo delivery, border security, and weather monitoring operate only under instrument flight rules. The FAA analyzed UAS flights in controlled airspace and learned that it can manage the demand using existing automation.

==== Above 60,000 feet ====
Aircraft flying above 60,000 feet MSL cooperatively separate through shared situational awareness. Air navigation service provider coordination is limited for these flights, some of which may be long endurance operations supporting internet services or research. Airships and hypersonic aircraft are examples of what could occupy these altitudes.

Flights at these altitudes have been few because traditional aircraft are not designed to ascend that high. With the anticipated increase in demand for manned and unmanned upper airspace operations, the FAA developed a concept of operations for safe and efficient flight above 60,000 feet MSL. It describes operator flight planning, interaction with air traffic control, and contingency management.

=== Technologies and capabilities ===
The FAA is working in various ways to help integrate unmanned aircraft into the National Airspace System.

==== DroneZone ====
FAADroneZone Logo.

DroneZone is the official FAA website for managing drone services, including small unmanned UAS registration. DroneZone supports the collection and processing of airspace authorizations and waivers, operational waivers, and accident reporting. It is a starting point for drone pilots with various resources to ensure the responsible use of drones. The FAA expects to develop other products and enhance the website, such as by providing a single access point for all DroneZone modules used by the UAS community.

==== Low Altitude Authorization and Notification ====
As a form of UAS data exchange, the FAA created the Low Altitude Authorization and Notification Capability (LAANC), which automates how the FAA approves recreational pilots to fly small UAS in controlled airspace.

LAANC Logo

First operated as a prototype in 2017, LAANC simplifies and expands access to controlled airspace at or below 400 feet, increases awareness of where drone pilots can fly, and informs air traffic controllers of where and when drones are operating. In 2022, the FAA issued its millionth authorization to drone pilots.

The FAA established altitudes at and below which UAS may be granted automatic authorization. LAANC allows the FAA and FAA-approved companies to share data about airspace restrictions and pilot requests. The companies are known as UAS service suppliers, and they develop desktop and mobile applications to provide LAANC access for drone pilots.

The FAA introduces capabilities annually. As requirements and operating rules develop, the FAA will deploy updates to enhance operations. A common logging and monitoring service for LAANC deployed in 2022. To maintain continuity of services, the FAA migrated the DroneZone and LAANC platforms to the FAA Cloud Services ecosystem through the UAS Ecosystem Capabilities program in 2023. In 2024, the FAA continued expansion of Department of Defense access, B4UFLY implementation, and software enhancements. The FAA anticipates introducing new capabilities annually.

==== Airborne Collision Avoidance System ====
The Airborne Collision Avoidance System X (ACAS X) has the flexibility to be used for new classes of users. It can reduce unnecessary alerts, select alternative surveillance sources, and enable airspace procedures and operations in the future. The ACAS program is divided into different subsets for multiple types of aircraft, including ACAS sXu for small UAS and ACAS Xr for rotorcraft.

ACAS sXu is a modular, tunable, and scalable technology to detect and avoid traffic. ACAS Xr extends the collision avoidance system capability with an optimized alerting logic that accounts for the unique flight characteristics of rotorcraft. The FAA will work with RTCA to develop minimum operational performance standards for both versions. The standards for ACAS sXu were completed in 2023 and are planned to be finished for ACAS Xr in 2025. These standards enable companies to start adopting the technology on their aircraft.

==== Remote identification ====
The remote identification rule requires most drones operating in U.S. airspace to have a remote identification capability and transmit information such as the drone's location and control station or takeoff location by March 16, 2024. Remote ID helps the FAA, other federal agencies, and law enforcement agencies to find the control station when a drone appears to be flying unsafely or is where it is not allowed to fly.

Remote identification of drones enables the safety and security needed for more complex drone operations. The FAA's supporting services for Remote ID follow a model of data exchange with internal users and other government agencies similar to LAANC called DISCVR, or Drone Information for Safety, Compliance, Verification, and Reporting.

DISCVR will provide capabilities to receive, correlate, retrieve, and distribute timely, comprehensive UAS information to authorized FAA staff and federal security partners using Remote ID information. Supporting services include user authentication and authorization, service logging and monitoring, and geospatial data management.

A U.S. Government Accountability Office report has indicated that the capability is not at its full potential as law enforcement agencies are unaware of it and how it could help them.

=== Space operations ===
Space operations continue to increase. In 2024, the FAA safely managed 142 commercially licensed space launches and six reentries. The FAA is pursuing ways to improve management of space operations to meet their current and projected increase.

To ensure safety and security during commercial space operations, the FAA blocks airspace for extended periods of time. With 14 FAA-licensed commercial spaceports located across the country, complicated restrictions affect an increasing number of NAS users. The FAA objective is to safely maximize airspace availability to support space operations while minimizing negative effects on other NAS stakeholders.

==== Space Data Integrator ====
The FAA is incorporating the Space Data Integrator (SDI), which is an automated tool that delivers spacecraft-related telemetry information to the FAA Air Traffic Control System Command Center. The FAA deployed an SDI operational prototype to monitor launch and reentry vehicle location and status in near real time. SDI automatically transfers data to the Traffic Flow Management System, an FAA decision support system.

The prototype is expected to increase overall air traffic management efficiency and safety through awareness of an operator's spacecraft location, trajectory, potential or actual debris, and return to Earth, while reducing manual work during space operations.

The SDI can shorten the length of airspace closures in half, from an average of more than four hours per launch to more than two hours. Reducing airspace closures will reduce reroutes that cause flight delays and increase fuel consumption. The use of SDI is expected to rise as partnerships with commercial space operators grow. As of 2024, the FAA receives space vehicle launch and reentry flight data from three companies through the SDI. Under the current schedule, implementation of the final tool will be completed in 2032.

==== Hazard risk and management software ====
In an effort similar to SDI, the FAA Space Integration Capabilities Hazard Volume project will help customize and minimize airspace restrictions during space operations. The FAA will be able to manage the airspace more dynamically, resulting in less airspace blocked off before and during launch and reentry, and reduce the duration of closed airspace to other NAS users as the mission progresses.

An FAA-led team demonstrated a public-private approach to space integration that leverages dynamically generated hazard areas. In 2021, SpaceX participated with the FAA in the interest of public safety. The company agreed to use a prototype hazard risk and management software to generate debris hazard volumes using live data during an in-flight abort launch mission from the NASA Kennedy Space Center in Florida.

An En Route Automation Modernization (ERAM) system at the Florida NextGen Test Bed received and displayed the hazard volumes SpaceX produced using the software. The demonstration showed that the FAA has a viable way to safely and efficiently integrate space vehicle operations into the NAS while satisfying the needs of other stakeholders and users, such as airlines.

New real-time hazard area generation technology would cut down the time it takes for debris hazard volumes to be produced and distributed from 15 to 20 minutes to less than 5 minutes. Controllers and traffic managers would have much more time to reroute and notify affected aircraft if a spacecraft malfunctions, greatly reducing the risk of a casualty from falling debris. A concept of use was developed in 2024. The technology will be demonstrated at the Florida NextGen Test Bed in Daytona in 2025 on Advanced Technologies and Oceanic Procedures, ERAM, and Traffic Flow Management System to show how it could improve air traffic operations during expected and unplanned events.

== Challenges ==
NextGen implementation is almost complete, and the FAA dealt with multiple issues along the way. In many cases, foundational systems are installed on aircraft as well as on the ground. The interoperability of air and ground systems, along with the need to synchronize equipage and other industry investments with FAA programs, has been a primary challenge. Standards, regulations, and procedures had to be developed. Program execution planning considered cost, schedule, and technical performance. Stakeholder acceptance and support are needed in areas such as equipage and using new capabilities. All involved—industry, federal agencies, government partners, and Congress—needed to be on the same path ahead.

=== Funding ===
Government shutdowns, furloughs, sequestration, and the lack of a long-term reauthorization made planning and executing modernization efforts more difficult. Inconsistent annual appropriations hurt long-term planning. A large, complex federal government agency and unpredictable appropriations were expected to, at best, only deliver sporadic and incremental change.

NextGen total cost estimates increased since fiscal year 2004. The FAA's 2016 business case estimate projected the agency's cost through 2030 at $20.6 billion, $5.8 billion already spent from 2007 to 2014 and a projected $14.8 billion from 2015 to 2030. This amount was $2.6 billion more than it anticipated in 2012 and within the range of the Joint Planning and Development Office's 2007 cost estimate of $15 billion to $22 billion. Using standard budget categories, the projected costs consisted of capital expenditures from the agency's facilities and equipment budget of $16 billion, research and other expenditures in the agency's research and development budget line of $1.5 billion, and operations expenses of $3.1 billion.

The total equipage cost estimate for commercial aircraft from 2015 to 2030 was $4.9 billion, a decrease of $500 million as reported in the 2014 Business Case for NextGen. The equipage cost estimate for general aviation aircraft—jet, turboprop, and piston engine—through 2030 remained constant at $8.9 billion.

As of 2022, the U.S. government spent more than $14 billion on NextGen. The cost to the federal government and industry is expected to be at least $35 billion through 2030, which exceeds the FAA business case estimate of $34.4 billion for agency and avionics costs.

The Department of Transportation Inspector General was concerned with the FAA's practice of dividing its programs into multiple segments, and funding each segment for a set timeframe or number of milestones because it may mask the final costs. Another pressing factor is that the FAA is managing three "versions" of the National Airspace System: the legacy system, NextGen, and the modernization plan after NextGen. Being in that position strains resources as the demands for sustainment and modernization increase but funding remains the same.

=== Equipage ===
To boost equipage, the FAA used a combination of rules where needed, such as with Automatic Dependent Surveillance–Broadcast (ADS-B), and incentives where beneficial, for example with Data Communications (Data Comm), to achieve equipage levels that supported the business case for the system under acquisition. Locations with a high mixed equipage environment create challenges for air traffic controllers to uniformly apply a NextGen improvement.

Through an FAA incentive and industry spending, the Data Comm program exceeded its goal of 1,900 domestic air carrier aircraft equipped by 2019. As of June 2024, more than 11,300 aircraft were equipped for tower service and 6,700 for en route services. No regional aircraft were equipped for Data Comm as of January 2023.

As of September 2022, almost every air transport aircraft was equipped for area navigation operations and some required navigation performance (RNP) procedures, but equipage rates ranged from 78 to 88 percent for other types of RNP procedures.

A total of 169,116 U.S. aircraft were properly equipped for ADS-B as of January 1, 2025, which is more than 70 percent of U.S. registered aircraft. About 60 percent of the aircraft are equipped with optional ADS-B In.

To achieve the full benefits of trajectory-based operations, users must equip with the required avionics, including Performance Based Navigation, Data Comm, and ADS-B In, and industry agrees on the value of equipping despite the costs. The FAA and NextGen Advisory Committee partnered to create a minimum capability list that covers communications, navigation, surveillance, and resiliency. The list serves as a guide of recommended minimum aircraft capabilities and associated equipage needed to derive the maximum benefit from NextGen investments and operational improvements.

=== Training ===
Implementing trajectory-based operations requires cultural changes among air traffic controllers and industry. Training and other human factors changes are necessary for air traffic controllers, pilots, traffic flow managers, and dispatchers. Industry need to work closely with the FAA as the agency moves to this new form of air traffic management. To maximize throughput, airlines and others have to agree that throughput and predictability are the primary metrics the FAA will use to judge the system's effectiveness. This could be different from, or even in some cases counter to, the traditional flight efficiency metrics used by airlines including reduced delay, reduced track miles, and reduced fuel burn.

=== Operational integration ===
Operational integration of all air-ground capabilities is needed to achieve the full benefits of NextGen. Due to the integrated nature of NextGen, many of its component systems are mutually dependent on one or more other systems. For example, time-based management works best when aircraft can fly the appropriate navigation procedures. The FAA implements systems through segments that the stakeholder community agrees are useful and that balance costs and benefits. The FAA expects to complete implementation of all major planned systems by 2030 but not the full integration necessary to provide all anticipated NextGen benefits.

=== New entrants ===
The FAA is pursuing ways to safely and efficiently integrate drones, advanced air mobility aircraft, commercial spacecraft, and other future aircraft into the National Airspace System (NAS) with minimal effect on other NAS users. This effort involves determining the required automation support and security, as well as the communications, navigation, and surveillance capabilities that account for the unique performance characteristics of non-traditional aircraft. NextGen technologies are expected to facilitate this integration.

=== Noise ===
Communities around airports are concerned about noise. Performance Based Navigation (PBN) has created a concentrated path of flights in cities across the United States. The new paths often reduce the number of people exposed to noise, but those who experience noise hear it far more consistently. The effects of noise on health, well-being, and economic output are well-documented. Excessive exposure to noise can lead to learning difficulties in children, decreased cardiovascular health, and degraded quality of life.

Congress set up a coalition to study the noise issues. A Government Accountability Office report on the environmental impacts at airports indicated that the changes in flight paths from NextGen would affect some communities that were previously unaffected or minimally affected by aircraft noise and expose them to increased noise levels. These levels could trigger the need for environmental reviews as well as raise community concerns. The report found that addressing environmental effects can delay the implementation of operational changes, and indicated that a systematic way of dealing with these effects and the resulting community concerns may help reduce such delays.

Regarding noise, the FAA renewed its focus to inform the community and solicit aviation user and citizen input when developing navigation procedures. The FAA has traditionally followed the National Environmental Policy Act (NEPA) process when designing and implementing procedures. However, more community involvement has been necessary, especially when flight paths are changed due to new PBN procedures. The FAA said it increased its public engagement to educate communities about how the agency develops procedures and measures noise and listened to residents' concerns. The FAA also works with airports, airlines, and community officials to determine how the agency can best balance the FAA's pursuit of safer, more efficient flight paths with the needs of nearby communities.

=== Cybersecurity ===
Cybersecurity challenges the FAA in at least three areas: protecting air traffic control information systems, guarding aircraft avionics, and determining cybersecurity roles and responsibilities among multiple FAA offices. The NextGen transition from point-to-point communications to an interconnected internet-based system could increase cyber risk.

The FAA Stakeholder Collaboration Division participated in the Interagency Core Cyber Team (ICCT) led jointly by the FAA, Department of Defense, and Department of Homeland Security to promote collaboration and federal government leadership in aviation cybersecurity. It applied partner agencies' cybersecurity expertise, technologies, and tools for shared benefit, and identified and assessed cybersecurity vulnerabilities in aviation and ways to reduce them.

The Interagency Planning Office, the predecessor to the Stakeholder Collaboration Division, also established two ICCT sub-teams—Cyber Exercises and Cyber R&D—to ensure interagency cybersecurity exercises and research yield the greatest benefits. Cyber Guard exercises highlight the shortcomings in cybersecurity guidance and policy. To take on these deficits, the ICCT and IPO co-sponsored a survey of cyber guidance, policy, regulations, authorities, and more with the Department of Defense.

Another measure the FAA is adopting is a zero trust architecture to guard against cyberattacks for the issuers of digital identity credentials.

=== Pandemic ===
The FAA took steps to protect its workforce from and limit exposure to the novel coronavirus that causes COVID-19, including the use of maximum telework. Because implementation cannot entirely be accomplished remotely, the pandemic slowed the progress of NextGen.

== Criticism ==
The challenge of a large-scale NAS modernization effort are plentiful, and this has led to a lot of criticism despite the best intentions of the FAA and other organizations involved in NextGen.

=== Noise ===
Performance Based Navigation (PBN) with GPS-based waypoints can reduce fuel burn and emissions. It causes flight paths to be more consolidated and consistent: this reduces noise exposure for a majority of communities but increases noise exposure for people who live under the current paths. Many localities even hear air traffic over previously quiet areas.

Navigation changes angered residents living with increased noise from the extra traffic, and they pushed back on the FAA. Multiple municipalities filed suit. Among the metropolitan areas affected are Baltimore, Boston, Charlotte, Los Angeles, Phoenix, San Diego, and Washington, D.C. Some community members believe efforts to reduce noise over homes should have been predicted before NextGen navigation changes went into effect, and that the decisions were a complete failure on the part of the FAA and its former administrator, Michael Huerta.

A committee tasked with recommending ways to reduce airplane noise in California voted in favor of a new flight path similar to one in place before a March 2015 change by the FAA. It would improve and not eliminate NextGen modifications. Some flight patterns were not changed in the Washington, D.C., area after the FAA received community feedback, although changes brought by NextGen were still considered a problem and won't alter the amount of noise in the area.

=== Progress ===
In May 2017, U.S. Department of Transportation Inspector General Calvin Scovel told Congress that although NextGen has progressed, full implementation of all capabilities and the realization of benefits was still years away. Of the 156 milestones the FAA reported as completed through March 2017, most were attributed to the implementation of wake recategorization and Data Communications (Data Comm) at airport towers. Significant work remained to deploy new Performance Based Navigation (PBN) procedures to capture airspace efficiencies and boost arrival rates, develop surface technologies to enhance capacity on crowded runways and taxiways, and install en route Data Comm.

To continue progress toward major program milestones, the FAA needed to resolve key risk areas that materially affected the delivery, capabilities, and benefits of modernization priorities. Recognizing these risks with its NextGen Advisory Committee priority areas, the FAA adjusted its plans and established a three-year rolling joint implementation plan updated at the beginning of each fiscal year to focus on high-benefit, high-readiness capabilities. The FAA and industry also agreed on ways to increase communication on these issues.

NextGen successfully transformed aviation communication, navigation, and surveillance, achieving its goal of modernizing the NAS. It provided an integrated information environment, laying the foundation for the next era of airspace modernization. With the successful completion of Data Communications, Terminal Flight Data Manager, and Weather programs in 2025, the groundwork laid by NextGen will now support the integration of diverse operations such as UAS, UAM/AAM and Upper Class E, facilitating enhanced information sharing and decision-making.

As part of its efforts to safely integrate UAS into the NAS, the NextGen program has initiated—and in some cases completed—several activities that also advance the objectives of airspace modernization. These accomplishments include expanded access for UAS operations through collision avoidance standards as well as digital access to UAS facility maps and FAA recognized identification areas (FRIAs). Additionally, UAS operators are now able to obtain authorizations in controlled airspace through Low Altitude Authorization and Notification Capability (LAANC). The ongoing modernization efforts will continue advancements towards the NAS2040 vision as the FAA begins to build a Brand New Air Traffic Control System and transitions to the next phase of airspace modernization.

=== Performance ===
In a report from Lou E. Dixon, former Department of Transportation principal assistant inspector general for auditing and evaluation, the FAA's major acquisitions since the creation of the Air Traffic Organization continue to lack in performance. The cost of six programs increased by a total of $692 million, and schedule delays averaged 25 months. Reporting on overall program costs, schedules, and benefits became unclear and inconsistent. Notwithstanding reforms, several underlying and systemic issues—including overambitious plans, shifting requirements, software development problems, ineffective contract and program management, and unreliable cost and schedule estimates—affect the FAA's ability to introduce new technologies and capabilities that are critical to the transition to NextGen.

During a meeting with airline chief executive officers shortly after taking office in 2017, President Donald Trump said the Obama administration spent more than $7 billion to upgrade the system and "totally failed." However, FAA administrator Michael Huerta said in a speech that NextGen had provided $2.7 billion in benefits and was on track to provide more than $157 billion more by 2030. Huerta acknowledged government procurement requirements have slowed the NextGen rollout. The FAA measures and reports the value of benefits. The agency still projects $100 billion worth of benefits by 2030 in its Section 502 NextGen report although in the past it had said that amount was unachievable in that timeframe. Among the findings of a 2024 U.S. Department of Transportation Office of Inspector General audit report was that NextGen will be "less transformational than originally promised."

After a U.S. Army Blackhawk helicopter collided with an American Airlines jet over the Potomac River by Washington Reagan National Airport January 29, 2025, President Trump in his second term of office expressed his desire to build a "great" new air traffic control system for less money than has been spent on NextGen.

The Department of Transportation Office of Inspector General noted the FAA was slow to deliver results, overestimated the value of benefits, and that industry believes the FAA is lacking in transparency. A House Transportation and Infrastructure Committee spokesperson expressed disappointment in the efforts to modernize the NAS, in particular NextGen, in reaction to a 2024 GAO report urging action to modernize aging systems.

=== Communication ===
Another concern is that the FAA's business case plan does not communicate the range of uncertainty or complex factors associated with NextGen implementation to Congress, aviation stakeholders, or the traveling public, which limits the agency's ability to set realistic expectations for NextGen benefits. The National Research Council's 2015 "Review of the Next Generation Air Transportation System" report found that the effort emphasizes modernizing aging equipment and systems—a shift from its original vision that is not clear to all stakeholders.

=== System architecture ===
The National Research Council's 2015 "Review of the Next Generation Air Transportation System" report explained that NextGen needed an explicit system architecture—in addition to its existing enterprise architecture—to guide its development, manage risk, and cope with change. To create this architecture, the FAA should build an architecture community and also strengthen its workforce in several technical fields. The report also examined the incorporation of cybersecurity, unmanned aircraft systems, and human factors into the NextGen architecture. Finally, the report considered NextGen's anticipated costs and benefits, noting that airlines are not motivated to spend money on NextGen because they receive few direct benefits and face schedule uncertainty.

=== Privatization ===
Before a meeting to discuss air traffic control privatization, the U.S. House of Representatives Committee on Transportation and Infrastructure staff sent a letter in May 2017 to the committee members noting a 35-year legacy of failed air traffic control modernization management, including NextGen. The letter said the FAA initially described NextGen as fundamentally transforming how air traffic would be managed. However, in 2015 the National Research Council explained that NextGen, as currently executed, was not broadly transformational and that it is a set of programs to implement a suite of incremental changes to the National Airspace System (NAS).

Criticism of NextGen led to a renewed drive to reform air traffic control, supported by the Trump Administration, by moving this function from the government to a not-for-profit, independent entity managed by a professional board of directors. Privatization was an effort to improve the pace of NAS modernization, and is supported by Airlines for America, the industry trade organization for the leading U.S. airlines. However, the general aviation community resists it because it may increase their costs of operation.

In 2018, the leading advocate for privatization, Rep. Bill Shuster, ended his effort as there was not enough support for it despite bipartisan support among lawmakers, industry, and labor groups. During a luncheon at the Aero Club of Washington in 2024, the former representative said he still believes in privatization. With President Trump returning to the White House in 2025, there may be renewed interest for it to happen.

== Future ==
The FAA Reauthorization Act of 2024 gives an end date of the FAA Office of NextGen and the work of this office as December 31, 2025. All unfinished NextGen programs will transfer to the new Airspace Modernization Office.

Building upon NextGen and also supporting trajectory-based operations, the next FAA initiative for U.S. National Airspace System modernization was going to be centered on information. The FAA published "Charting Aviation's Future: Vision for an Info-Centric National Airspace System" in 2022 to begin the discussion of what comes after NextGen. This initiative intends to incorporate innovative technologies into a fully integrated information environment for all types of operations, from the smallest drone to the largest spacecraft. The vision covers three areas: operations, infrastructure, and integrated safety management.

Without any mention of NextGen or Info-Centric National Airspace System, transportation secretary Sean Duffy announced a plan to create a new air traffic control system by 2028 during a news conference May 8, 2025. This new system covers communications, surveillance, automation, and facilities.

Communications changes would replace the existing telecommunications infrastructure from Time-Division Multiplexing (TDM) to Internet Protocol (IP). radios using TDM to IP, and legacy voice switches with Voice IP. NAS Voice System was part of NextGen until the contract with Harris Corp. was canceled in 2018. Deployment of full services en route Data Communications from NextGen would be accelerated.

For surveillance, the plan is to replace 618 FAA airborne radar systems and the surface movement radar used at 44 airports. The Surface Awareness Initiative system would expand to 200 airports. Automatic Dependent Surveillance-Broadcast (ADS-B) ground stations would be installed to assist traffic in the Caribbean. ADS-B resulted from NextGen and supports surface radar and surface awareness.

Under automation, the plan would scrap NextGen’s En Route Automation Modernization system and Standard Terminal Automation Replacement System for a new common automation platform. Deployment of Flow Management and Data Services as well as Terminal Flight Data Manager started during NextGen would continue and grow. The Enhanced Information Display System and Alaska Automation Capability are two proposed improvements that were not part of NextGen. Alaska would receive an Automated Weather Observing Station at 50 locations, a Visual Weather Observing System at 60 locations, and weather cameras at 64 sites.

Facilities are not a part of NextGen but are included in the new modernization plan. With en route centers on average 61 years old, the plan calls for building six new centers. For the other two zones of air traffic control, the plan deploys 15 new towers and 15 collocated terminal radar control facilities.
