= System Wide Information Management =

Sharing of data from national air traffic control agencies

System Wide Information Management (SWIM) is a global Air Traffic Management (ATM) industry initiative to harmonize the exchange of Aeronautical, Weather and Flight information for all Airspace Users and Stakeholders. SWIM is an integral part of the International Civil Aviation Organization (ICAO) Global Air Navigation Plan (GANP) . The GANP defines 4 Performance Improvement Areas (PIA), SWIM resides in PIA 2: Globally interoperable systems and data, where its implementation is further defined in Aviation System Block Upgrades (ASBU) B1-SWIM and B2-SWIM. ASBU B1-SWIM defines SWIM as a “a net-centric operation where the air traffic management (ATM) network is considered as a series of nodes, including the aircraft, providing or using information.” it goes on to say “The sharing of information of the required quality and timeliness in a secure environment is an essential enabler to the ATM target concept.”

ICAO Annex 3 defines what IWXXM capability is required at different time frames. These capabilities can also be considered in context of the ICAO SWIM-concept (Doc 10039, Manual on System Wide Information Management (SWIM) Concept).

Eurocontrol initially presented the SWIM System concept to the Federal Aviation Administration (FAA) in 1997 and in 2005, the ICAO Global ATM Operational Concept adopted the SWIM concept to promote information-based ATM integration. SWIM is now part of development projects in the United States (Next Generation Air Transportation System, or NextGen), the Middle East (GCAA SWIM Gateway) and the European Union (Single European Sky ATM Research).

Within the FAA, the FAA SWIM program is an advanced technology program designed to facilitate greater sharing of ATM system information, such as airport operational status, weather information, flight data, status of special use airspace, and National Airspace System (NAS) restrictions. SWIM will support current and future NAS programs by providing a flexible and secure information management architecture for sharing NAS information. SWIM will use commercial off-the-shelf hardware and software to support a Service Oriented Architecture (SOA) that will facilitate the addition of new systems and data exchanges and increase common situational awareness. SWIM is part of FAA's NextGen, an umbrella term for the ongoing evolution of the United States' NAS from a ground-based system of air traffic control (ATC) to a satellite-based system of air traffic management. The transformation to NextGen requires programs and technologies that provide more efficient operations, including streamlined communications capabilities. The SWIM program is an integral part of that transformation that will connect FAA systems. The SWIM program will also enable interaction with other members of the decision-making community including other government agencies, air navigation service providers, and airspace users. The SWIM program will lead to a variety of benefits. SWIM will help improve aviation safety through increased common situational awareness by allowing more decision makers to access the same information. This will provide consistent information to different users (pilots, controllers, dispatchers) that supports proactive decision-making.

SWIM as a concept is essential to providing the most efficient use of airspace, managing air traffic around weather, and increasing common situational awareness on the ground. SWIM core services will enable systems to request and receive information when they need it, subscribe for automatic receipt, and publish information and services as appropriate. This will provide for sharing of information across different systems. This will allow airspace users and controllers to access the most current information that may be affecting their area of responsibility in a more efficient manner. SWIM will improve decision-making and streamline information sharing for improved planning and execution.

SWIM will also help reduce infrastructure costs by decreasing the number of unique interfaces between systems. Initially, SWIM will provide a common interface framework, reducing the operation and maintenance costs of current interfaces. New systems will interface with each other via SWIM-compliant interfaces, thereby reducing future data interface development costs. Ultimately, redundant data sources will no longer be needed, and associated systems will be decommissioned.

SWIM is one of the key component of the SESAR (Single European Sky ATM Research) programme managed by the SESAR Joint Undertaking
