= National Airspace System Voice Switch =

The United States National Airspace System Voice Switch (NVS) project, a part of the Next Generation Air Transportation System (NextGen), aims to establish a single set of scalable voice switches that can support a dynamic flow of air traffic. Voice communications network flexibility is essential for the Federal Aviation Administration (FAA) to increase air traffic control network flexibility.

== Description ==
Voice communications is a fundamental part of providing air traffic control services. Both air-to-ground and ground-to-ground voice communications are essential for the en route, flight service and terminal domains of aircraft flights to provide safe, orderly and efficient flow of air traffic.

Modern voice switching infrastructure is considered a key enabler for integrating mixed traffic in the National Airspace System, including high-altitude airline operations, general aviation and low-level rotorcraft flights. The NAS Voice Switch is intended to give controllers flexible access to multiple radio and telephone resources and to support future concepts such as trajectory-based operations and increased use of satellite-based navigation and surveillance, while maintaining reliable communication with aircraft in busy terminal areas and complex low-altitude environments.

In the early years of the twenty-first century, air traffic control air-ground and ground-ground voice communications are managed on a geographical basis. The equipment used is a mixture of seventeen different types, some already 20 years old.

Current voice communications switches are very static, and the ability to adjust the airspace for varying loads very limited. An air traffic controller in Miami in winter time may be over-loaded, whilst in the remainder of the year under-loaded. During the same periods, an air traffic controller in Minneapolis may be under-loaded in winter, and over-loaded at other times. With an inflexible system, the solution has to be to physically move controllers to cope with the higher workloads.

NVS aims to enable voice switch flexibility by allowing the airspace to be dynamically reconfigured according to workload, without the physical movement of staff. So, an air traffic controller in Minneapolis could be logically reassigned to Miami without a physical movement being necessary. A migration from analog communications to Voice over Internet Protocol (VOIP) is also being considered.

== Benefits ==
NVS will enable FAA air traffic control to establish a network-based communications system, to evolve towards flexible communications routing that provides dynamic re-sectorisation, resource reallocation, airspace redesign, and improved aircraft flow capacity.

NVS will:

- use open systems standards and/or commercial off-the-shelf equipment
- reduce equipment inventories of out-of-date switch types
- reduce acquisition, training and maintenance costs by reducing the number of voice switch designs
- improve equipment availability
- enable flexible allocation of access to communications resources to meet both strategic and tactical demands
- enable flexible user access profile definitions to assure secure access to the system and to enable defined roles to be performed
- provide scalability
- provide a fault-tolerant system.

== Development ==
Northrop Grumman Corporation announced the demonstration of the company's Next Generation Voice Over Internet Protocol (VoIP) Voice Switch to officials of the FAA in preparation for the upcoming National Airspace System Voice Switch program competition. The demonstration was the second phase of Northrop Grumman's response to a Request for Information issued by the FAA for the NVS program.
