= BULATSA =

Bulgarian authority managing air traffic control

BULATSA is the Bulgarian Air Traffic Services Authority, a branch of the Bulgarian Civil Aviation Administration responsible for air traffic management within Bulgaria's airspace.

== Establishment ==
The establishment of BULATSA is the result of a chain of events in the history of Bulgarian civil aviation. In 1946, a Directorate on Air Communications was established, subordinated to the Council of Ministers. In 1948, the Law on Aviation came into force and it went through a series of amendments over the years until the Civil Aviation Act of the Republic of Bulgaria evolved. As a result of the increased requirements to civil aviation, in 1966, the State Economic Association "Bulgarian Civil Aviation" was established. In 1967, the Republic of Bulgaria ratified the 1944 Chicago Convention on International Civil Aviation and became a member of the International Civil Aviation Organisation. BULATSA is an EUROCONTROL member since 1997.

== Legal status and organisation of BULATSA ==
Under the Civil Aviation Act and as per the meaning of article 62, paragraph 3 of the Law on Commerce, the state-owned enterprise "Bulgarian Air Traffic Services Authority" (BULATSA) is a legal entity having its seat in Sofia and performing state functions for the provision of air navigation services in the controlled civil airspace of the Republic of Bulgaria, in line with the international agreements in the field of civil aviation signed and ratified by the Republic of Bulgaria.

Pursuant to article 53, paragraph. 2 of the Civil Aviation Act, the scope of BULATSA's activities encompasses all aircraft departing from and arriving at civil airports and overflying the controlled civil airspace of the Republic of Bulgaria.

BULATSA consists of central headquarters and air traffic control centres. The headquarters is composed of general and specialised administration and maintenance sectors. The general administration is responsible for legal and financial matters, human resources management, external relations and protocol, administrative and social services, health and safety, security and maintenance of building structures and adjacent infrastructure. The specialised administration has been entrusted with the planning and development of the national air traffic management system, including air traffic management, communications, navigation and surveillance (CNS), informational, air navigational, meteorological, metrological, lighting and energy provision of flights and safety management of the process of air traffic service provision.

== Main activities ==
BULATSA performs the following main activities as defined in the Civil Aviation Act:

1. Air traffic management and provision of air navigation services to enable the safe, efficient and expeditious flow of traffic in the controlled civil air space;
2. Organisation and management of the controlled civil air space;
3. Organisation and management of air traffic flows;
4. Provision, maintenance and operation of the relevant systems and equipment to ensure the communications, navigation, surveillance, power-supply, meteorological and aeronautical aspects of air traffic management and its supporting infrastructure;
5. Provision of information services for aircraft search and rescue operations;
6. Management of the safety system in the framework of its vested competence;
7. Fulfilment of the obligations of the Republic of Bulgaria arising from international agreements in the ATM area, to which the Republic of Bulgaria is a party;
8. Collection of en-route charges for the provision of air navigation services;
9. Provision of air traffic services;
10. Provision of aeronautical information services;
11. Provision of meteorological services;
12. Provision of metrological services;
13. Setting up and maintenance of education and qualification centres.

BULATSA also has the right to provide other services related to its main activity.

BULATSA interacts with the Bulgarian Civil Aviation Administration at the Ministry of Transport, with the Headquarters of the Military Air Forces, as well as other organisations and authorities depending on their powers and responsibilities. BULATSA takes part in the work of international civil aviation organisations to which the Republic of Bulgaria is a member state.

The activities of BULATSA are financed mainly from the collected en-route air navigation charges according to the principles of the Chicago Convention of 1944.

== Management bodies of BULATSA ==
1. The Minister of Transport;
2. The Management Board;
3. The Director General.

== Air traffic control centres operated by BULATSA ==
- Area Control Centre (ACC) in Sofia;
- APP/TWR Centres in Varna, Burgas, Plovdiv and Gorna Oryahovitsa
