= SESAR Joint Undertaking =

Single European Sky ATM Research 3 Joint Undertaking
- SESAR 3 JU

Joint Undertaking overview
- Formed: 2021 (established)
- Headquarters: Avenue de Cortenbergh 100 1000 Brussels Belgium; 50.844710°N 4.388730°E
- Joint Undertaking executive: Executive Director
- Key document: Council Regulation (EU) No 2021/2085
- Website: sesarju.eu

The Single European Sky ATM Research 3 Joint Undertaking is an institutionalised European public-private partnership, established in 2021, to accelerate through research and development the delivery of the Digital European Sky, as part of the SESAR project. Initiated in 2004, the SESAR project is the technological arm of the EU's Single European Sky initiative to integrate EU Member States' ATM systems. Bringing together the EU, Eurocontrol, and more than 50 organisations covering the entire aviation value chain, including drones, this European partnership is investing more than EUR 1.6 billion between now and 2030 to accelerate, through research and innovation, the delivery of an inclusive, resilient and sustainable Digital European Sky.

== Overview ==
Advancing innovations applied today in the digital economy will result in a radical transformation of Europe’s aviation infrastructure. Transforming the infrastructure that supports European aviation requires close collaboration between all the stakeholders that contribute to it.

The SESAR 3 JU builds on the work and achievements of earlier SESAR research and innovation programmes (SESAR 1 and SESAR 2020), but seeks to accelerate the market uptake of innovative solutions through a portfolio of demonstrators and a fast-track mechanism. The partnership acts as a catalyst for speeding up the transition towards a green, climate neutral and digital Europe, and for making European industry more resilient and competitive.

The research programme of the SESAR JU is designed as an innovation pipeline, made up of exploratory research, industrial research and validation and Digital Sky Demonstrators, where ideas are transformed into solutions. Calls related to the programme are launched within the framework of the EU’s Horizon Europe or Connecting Europe Facility funding programmes. These are open to private and public ‘for-profit’ and ‘not-for-profit’ organisations, including large enterprises and SMEs, research and technology organisations (RTOs), universities, associations, and any other type of legal entity.

== Legal basis ==
The SESAR Joint 3 Undertaking, was created under Community law on 21 November 2021.

== Funding and budget ==
The SESAR 3 JU is co-funded by the European Union through the Horizon Europe research and innovation programme and industry as follows: • Horizon Europe - EUR 600 million • Eurocontrol – up to EUR 500 million (in-kind and financial contributions) • Industry - EUR 500 million minimum (in-kind and financial contributions) In addition, the Digital European Sky programme will benefit from funding for its demonstrators from the Connecting Europe Facility (in coordination with European Climate, Infrastructure and Environment Executive Agency) to the value of at least EUR 200 million.

== Members ==
- Aeroporti di Roma
- AENA
- Paris Aéroport
- Air France
- Air Navigation Services Czech Republic (ANS CR)
- Airbus SAS
- Airtel ATN Limited
- Alliance for New Mobility Europe (AME)
- Athens International Airport
- Austro Control
- Brussels Airport Company
- Boeing
- BULATSA
- Centro Italiano Ricerche Aerospaziali (C.I.R.A.)
- Croatia Control
- Deutsche Lufthansa
- Deutsches Zentrum fur Luft- und Raumfahrt e.V. (DLR)
- DFS Deutsche Flugsicherung
- The French State – Ministry for an ecological transition, Direction générale de l’aviation civile (DGAC), Direction des services de la navigation aérienne
- Drone Alliance Europe
- easyJet
- Ecole Nationale de l’Aviation Civile (ENAC)
- ENAIRE
- ENAV
- Eurocontrol
- Flughafen München
- Frequentis
- Honeywell
- HungaroControl
- Indra Sistemas
- Irish Aviation Authority
- Copenhagen Airport
- ONERA
- Leonardo S.p.A
- Prague Airport
- Luftfartsverket
- Luchtverkeersleiding Nederland
- Navegação Aérea de Portugal
- Naviair
- Nederlands Lucht- en Ruimtevaartcentrum
- Pipistrel Vertical Solutions
- Polish Air Navigation Services Agency
- ROMATSA
- Ryanair
- SAAB
- SAFRAN
- SINTEF
- Amsterdam Airport Schiphol
- Società Esercizi Aeroportuali
- Swedavia
- Thales Group
- Collins Aerospace
- Volocopter
- VTT Technical Research Centre of Finland

== SESAR JU staff ==
The SESAR 3 Joint Undertaking is composed of around 40 staff. Andreas Boschen is the current executive director, previous executive directors include Florian Guillermet, now executive director at EASA .

== See also ==
- SESAR
