= Space Data Integrator =

Space Data Integrator is a process/service platform or tool being developed by the US FAA to integrate space launch and reentry into the US National Airspace System. It intends to oversee and manage airspace safety during space operations, ensuring the safety of vehicles more efficiently than manual processes.

== History ==
The project was initiated in 2015.

No funds for SDI were included in the FAA 2018 budget request.

In March 2018 the FAA initiated a Market Survey on the requirements for SDI.
