= Aviation System Performance Metrics =

FAA database of the National Airspace System

Aviation System Performance Metrics (ASPM) is an FAA database of the National Airspace System, a part of FAA Operations & Performance Data.

== Data Description ==
ASPM data fall into two categories, airport data and individual flight data. Airport data give airport capacity and throughput for every 15 minutes, and individual flight data give each airport's individual flight's scheduled and actual gate departure time, runway departure time, runway arrival time and gate arrival time, etc.

== Comprehensiveness ==
ASPM contains information on operated flights only, which means that canceled flights are not in ASPM. ASPM contains domestic flights only. ASPM is more comprehensive than BTS database maintained by Department Of Transportation(DOT).

== Accessibility ==
ASPM is not public available. A login is required and can be requested with a legitimate reason. Once a user has a login, they can access ASPM data through GUI or download raw data in DBF format.
