= Single European Sky ATM Research =

European air traffic control research program

Single European Sky ATM Research (SESAR) is a collaborative project to completely overhaul European airspace and its air traffic management (ATM). The actual program is managed by the SESAR Joint Undertaking as a public–private partnership (PPP).

== Project ==
The SESAR project is composed of three phases:

- a Definition phase (2004–2008) to deliver an ATM master plan defining the content, development, and deployment plans of the next generation of ATM systems. This definition phase is led by Eurocontrol, and co-funded by the European Commission under the Trans-European Transport Networks program and executed by a large consortium of all air transport stakeholders.
- a Development phase (2008–2013), to produce the required new generation of technological systems and components as defined in the definition phase. This phase (budget: 2.1 billion euro) is managed by the SESAR Joint Undertaking.
- a Deployment phase (2014–2020), for large-scale production and implementation of the new air traffic management infrastructure, composed of fully harmonized and interoperable components which guarantee high-performance air transport activities in Europe.

SESAR's target concept relies on several new key features:

- the network operation plan, a dynamic rolling plan for continuous operations that ensures a common view of the network situation;
- full integration of airport operations as part of ATM and the planning process;
- trajectory management, reducing the constraints of airspace organisation to a minimum;
- new aircraft separation modes, allowing increased safety, capacity and efficiency;
- system-wide information management (SWIM), securely connecting all the ATM stakeholders which will share the same data;
- humans as the central decision-makers: controllers and pilots will be assisted by new automated functions to ease their workload and handle complex decision-making processes.

The SESAR project has a parallel in the NextGen project within the United States.

== History ==
In the 20th century, unlike United States, Europe did not have a single civilian airspace – i.e., one in which air navigation is managed at the European level. Furthermore, European airspace is among the busiest in the world with over 33,000 flights daily and airport density in Europe is very high. This makes air traffic control more complex. The EU Single European Sky (SES) legislature was drawn to overcome the air control management's fragmentation and flight capacity limitation by structuring airspace and air navigation services at a pan-European level. To develop the needed technological capacity, the SESAR program was initiated in 2004 as a continuation of a smaller effort by the Eurocontrol SESAME project. In June 2010, European and American authorities reached a preliminary agreement on interoperability between their future air traffic management systems, SESAR and NextGen.

SESAR Deployment Phase was launched on December 5, 2014. This is seen as a key milestone of the SESAR project: a partnership agreement was signed by EU's Transport Commissioner Violeta Bulc and the SESAR Deployment Alliance consortium.

== Dates ==
- November 2000: establishment of the SES regulation.
- 2004: SESAR definition phase started.
- June 2008: SES-II regulation adopted.
- 8 December 2008: inauguration of the SESAR Joint Undertaking.
- 3 June 2009: official start of the SESAR development programme.
- 12 June 2009: SESAR Joint Undertaking signs agreement with 16 partners totalling €1.9 billion for the creation of the Europe's future ATM system.
- 19 July 2010: SESAR Joint Undertaking opens to Associate partners.
- 8 March 2011: The first SESAR Release during the SESAR Forum at ATC Global in Amsterdam.
- October 2012: European ATM Master Plan – Edition 2 was issued as pdf

== See also ==
- Single European Sky

== Bibliography ==
- Single European Sky (SES)
- The European ATM Master plan
- SESAR Joint Undertaking Top Management speaking at the Forum on Integration & Harmonization of NextGen and SESAR in Montreal
