= Dataprobe =

Dataprobe Inc
- Type: Privately held company
- Industry: Information Technology
- Founded: South Hackensack, New Jersey (1969)
- Headquarters: Allendale, New Jersey, United States
- Area served: International
- Key people: David Weiss (President, CEO); Jeff Schaefer (VP - Engineering, CTO); George Foote (VP - Sales); James Kalymnios (VP - Manufacturing)
- Products: Remote Power Control, Protection Switching
- Website: dataprobe.com

Dataprobe is an American manufacturer of systems for minimizing downtime to critical data and communication networks. Dataprobe power control products allow remote management of AC and DC power for reboot, energy management and security. Redundancy switching systems provide T-1 and physical layer switchover and failover for equipment and circuit redundancy. Remote relay control integrates legacy systems that relay on contact closures into the network environment. Products are sold to end users, resellers and OEMs.

In 2006, Dataprobe was selected by Harris Corporation to provide voice circuit redundancy switching for the FAA Telecommunications Infrastructure (FTI) project.

== Products ==
Remote Power Control
Redundancy Switching
Remote Relay Control
