= Joint Planning and Development Office =

Agency overview
- Formed: 2003
- Headquarters: Washington, D.C.
- Agency executive: Dr. Karlin Toner, JPDO Director
- Parent agency: Federal Aviation Administration
- Website: Joint Planning and Development Office

The United States Congress established the Joint Planning and Development Office (JPDO) in 2003 to plan and coordinate the development of the Next Generation Air Transportation System (NextGen). The JPDO is a multi-agency public/private initiative to include: United States Department of Transportation, United States Department of Defense, Department of Commerce, Department of Homeland Security, Federal Aviation Administration, National Aeronautics and Space Administrations, and White House Office of Science and Technology Policy. Congress ended funding for JPDO in 2014.

== History ==
The agency was formed in 2003 with the aim to increase developments in air traffic control, airspace management, satellite-based navigation, security , etc.

Since its inception, the JPDO has been in the development of a framework for planning NextGen, identifying and prioritizing key multi-agency concerns, and driving consensus in the development of investment choices and decisions.

The JPDO is governed by a Senior Policy Committee (SPC) that is made up of Cabinet-level representatives from each of the JPDO's government partners. The SPC is chaired by the Secretary of Transportation.

== Joint planning ==
One of the most critical objectives for the JPDO has been to develop the multi-agency planning structure. The framework for this work is the Joint Planning Environment (JPE). The JPE brings together the key planning tools that define NextGen. This includes the Concept of Operations (ConOps), the Enterprise Architecture, and the Integrated Work Plan (IWP). The ConOps is the description of how the NextGen system will work. The Enterprise Architecture provides a view of how NextGen will function and what capabilities need to be developed. In addition, it provides data from which analysis and modeling can be performed to assess options for determining the best business case for each set of investments and solutions.

The JPE is publicly available.The JPE, through a series of over 40 different reports, allows users to study the NextGen planning tools in terms of linkages, respective departmental and agency responsibilities, and timelines. This provides the user with the opportunity to see how NextGen development might be impacted by changes in schedule, funding, or relative priorities.

== NextGen Institute ==
The JPDO focused on establishing collaboration with other government departments and agencies and developing a strong relationship with the private sector. The JPDO created an entirely new organization called the NextGen Institute (http://www.ncat.com/ngats/index.html). The Institute provides the mechanism for industry to participate on an equal footing with their Federal counterparts in developing NextGen products and providing input on important policies. Currently the Institute has over 230 members.

The principal involvement for industry is through a series of joint, public/private sector Working Groups. Each group covers a specific subject area that is important to NextGen's development. In addition, each group has an industry and government co-chair, and has been tasked with providing extensive input into the NextGen planning process, as well as developing important products for use in future planning and implementation efforts.

=== Net-Centric Operations ===
A key challenge of NextGen is the development of a net-centric capability for the national airspace system to support the exchange of operational data. This includes the exchange of information between aircraft and ground systems, as well as between aircraft in flight. The Department of Defense has worked on net-centric technology, and through the JPDO, has contributed to the development of operating concept and key references for advanced network connectivity to support NextGen. The use of existing technologies and capabilities is among the objectives of the JPDO.

=== Integrated Surveillance ===
Another key JPDO contribution to the development of NextGen involves integrated surveillance. Integrated surveillance is the integration of cooperative and non-cooperative surveillance data in a user-defined environment. As NextGen initiatives, such as Automatic Dependent Surveillance Broadcast (ADS-B), a satellite-based navigation system, become available, it will be important to determine the optimum mix between cooperative surveillance capabilities like ADS-B and non-cooperative radar surveillance-based capabilities.

At an inter-agency surveillance summit in December 2008, the JPDO was asked to develop a concept of operations and architecture for integrated national aviation surveillance. The work will include development of a funding profile and a long-term recommendation regarding future system governance.

=== Research Coordination ===
NASA is the principal source of air traffic and aviation research. Historically, one of the most challenging aspects of this work has been the coordination of NASA's efforts with the operational needs of the FAA. This concern is only heightened by the expanded needs of NextGen.

== Issues ==
The Joint Planning and Development Office represents a substantial cultural change in the way government plans, coordinates, and budgets for a large-scale initiative. Rather than relying on coordination or cooperation on a situation-by-situation basis, the JPDO has brought together all of the government partners to work collaboratively in planning, designing, and implementing the NextGen initiative. However, working with so many different organizations has been a challenge. Each government department and agency has its own unique organizational culture which is reflected in its decision making processes, structure, planning process, and budgeting. Managing this challenge has required an extensive level of outreach, information sharing, collaboration, and negotiation.

One of the challenges in this undertaking has been in maintaining the "honest broker" status that is critical to this change-oriented approach to managing a large-scale initiative. It is important that the JPDO is organizationally positioned in a way that allows it to have sufficient latitude, under the direction of its SPC, to carry out its mission.
