= Performance-based navigation =

Outcome-oriented aircraft steering infrastructure

In aviation, performance-based navigation (PBN) is a specification issued by the International Civil Aviation Organization (ICAO). In PBN, aircraft required navigation performance (RNP) and area navigation (RNAV) systems performance requirements are to be defined in terms of accuracy, integrity, availability, continuity, and functionality required for the proposed operations in the context of a particular airspace, when supported by the appropriate navigation infrastructure.

== Description ==
Historically, aircraft navigation specifications have been specified directly in terms of sensors (navigation beacons and/or waypoints). A navigation specification that includes an additional requirement for on-board navigation performance monitoring and alerting is referred to as a required navigation performance (RNP) specification. One not having such requirements is referred to as an area navigation (RNAV) specification.

Performance requirements are identified in navigation specifications, which also identify the choice of navigation sensors and equipment that may be used to meet the performance requirements. The navigation specifications provide specific implementation guidance in order to facilitate global harmonisation.

Under PBN, generic navigation requirements are first defined based on the operational requirements. Civil aviation authorities then evaluate options in respect of available technology and navigation services. A chosen solution would be the most cost-effective for the civil aviation authority, as opposed to a solution being established as part of the operational requirements. Technology can evolve over time without requiring the operation itself to be revisited as long as the requisite performance is provided by the RNAV or RNP system.

PBN offers a number of advantages over the sensor-specific method of developing airspace and obstacle clearance criteria:

1. reduces the need to maintain sensor-specific routes and procedures, and their costs. For example, moving a single VOR can impact dozens of procedures, as a VOR can be used on routes, VOR approaches, missed approaches, etc. Adding new sensor-specific procedures would compound this cost, and the rapid growth in available navigation systems would soon make sensor-specific routes and procedures unaffordable;
2. avoids the need for developing sensor-specific operations with each new evolution of navigation systems, which would be cost-prohibitive. The expansion of satellite navigation services is expected to contribute to the continued diversity of RNP and RNAV systems in different aircraft. The original basic global navigation satellite system (GNSS) equipment is evolving due to the development of augmentations such as satellite-based augmentation systems (SBAS), ground-based augmentation systems (GBAS) and ground-based regional augmentation systems (GBAS), while the introduction of Galileo and the modernisation of the United States' Global Positioning System (GPS) and the Russian Global Navigation Satellite System (GLONASS) will further improve GNSS performance. The use of GNSS/inertial integration is also expanding;
3. allows for more efficient use of airspace (route placement, fuel efficiency and noise mitigation);
4. clarifies how RNAV systems are used; and
5. facilitates the operational approval process for civil aviation authorities by providing a limited set of navigation specifications intended for global use.

Within an airspace, PBN requirements will be affected by the communication, surveillance and air traffic control (ATC) environments, the navaid infrastructure and functional and operational capability needed to meet the ATM application. PBN performance requirements also depend on what reversion, non-RNAV means of navigation are available and what degree of redundancy is required to ensure adequate continuity of operations.

To achieve the efficiency and capacity gains partially enabled by RNAV and RNP, the FAA will pursue use of data communications and enhanced surveillance functionality.

== Background ==
Area navigation techniques and specifications started to evolve regionally without overall ICAO guidance. This consequently meant that terms and definitions such as "RNAV" and "RNP" had slightly different meanings in different regions of the world, and even other terms could be used locally. An example of this is the term "P-RNAV" (Precision RNAV) that Europe still uses (2019), which elsewhere is called "RNAV 1".

The terms RNAV and RNP was earlier used with little functional difference. RNP required a certain level of performance but made no attempt to define how it was to be guaranteed.

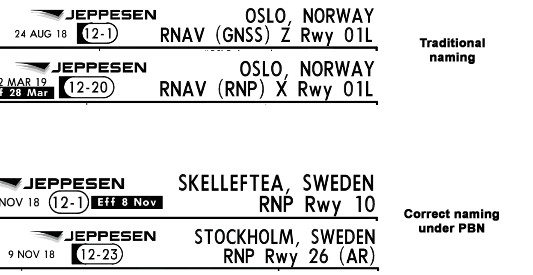
The two upper chart strips show the current norm. The two strips below reflect the same two approaches only with the correct RNP-designation. "RNAV (GNSS)" becomes "RNP", and "RNAV (RNP)" becomes "RNP AR". Sweden is one example of a member state who has already adopted the new correct RNP-designation for the PBN implementation.

Performance-based navigation (PBN) is ICAO's initiative to standardise terminology, specifications and meanings. One example is to standardise the terminology used around APVs (Approaches with vertical guidance). All APVs have until recently been designated as RNAV-approaches, while these in fact are RNP-approaches with respect to the PBN implementation. All APVs require on-board performance monitoring and alerting, so the system cannot only be capable of navigation down to the required degree of accuracy, but also needs to continuously monitor the performance and be capable of alerting the pilot if its performance falls below that which is required.

These approaches had some confusing names and designations on charts, and the changeover is currently being conducted across all member states. The two types of RNAV-approaches have traditionally been named RNAV (GNSS) and RNAV (RNP) respectively, where the former is the traditional straight-in approach from the final approach fix, and the latter is a more complex approach that curves in the horizontal plane after the final approach fix which requires authorization for it to be commenced (AR = Authorization Required). The correct naming and designation for these approaches under the PBN implementation are RNP and RNP AR respectively. The images to the right show the naming of the current charts being used, and what they will look like under PBN.

== Impact on airspace planning ==
When separation minima and route spacing are determined using a conventional sensor-based approach, the navigation performance data used to determine the separation minima or route spacing depend on the accuracy of the raw data from specific navigation aids such as VOR, DME or NDB. In contrast, PBN requires an RNAV system that integrates raw navigation data to provide a positioning and navigation solution. In determining separation minima and route spacing, this integrated navigation performance "output" is used.

The navigation performance required from the RNAV system is part of the navigation specification. To determine separation minima and route spacing, airspace planners fully exploit that part of the navigation specification which describes the performance required from the RNAV system. Airspace planners also make use of the required performance (accuracy, integrity, availability and continuity) to determine route spacing and separation minima.

In procedurally controlled airspace, separation minima and route spacing on RNP specifications are expected to provide a greater benefit than those based on RNAV specifications. This is because the on-board performance monitoring and alerting function could alleviate the absence of ATS surveillance service by providing an alternative means of risk mitigation.

== Transition to PBN ==
It is expected that all future RNAV and RNP applications will identify the navigation requirements through the use of performance specifications rather than defining specific navigation sensors.

The Valley of Mexico will be the first in Mexico where the performance-based navigation system is used, which will allow the new Felipe Ángeles International Airport, the Mexico City International Airport, and the Toluca International Airport to operate simultaneously without the operations of one impeding those of the others.

== Scope ==
For legacy reasons associated with the previous RNP concept, PBN is currently limited to operations with linear lateral performance requirements and time constraints. For this reason, operations with angular lateral performance requirements (i.e. approach and landing operations with GNSS vertical guidance—approach procedure with vertical guidance APV-I and APV-II), as well as instrument landing system (ILS) and microwave landing system (MLS) are not considered. Unlike the lateral monitoring and obstacle clearance, for barometric VNAV systems there is neither alerting on vertical error nor is there a two-times relationship between a 95% required total system accuracy and the performance limit. Therefore, barometric VNAV is not considered vertical RNP.

== On-board performance monitoring and alerting ==
On-board performance monitoring and alerting is the main element that determines whether a navigation system complies with the required safety level associated with an RNP application. It relates to both lateral and longitudinal navigation performance; and it allows the aircrew to detect that the navigation system is not achieving, or cannot guarantee with 10^{−5} integrity, the navigation performance required for the operation.

RNP systems provide improvements on the integrity of operations. This may permit closer route spacing and can provide sufficient integrity to allow only RNAV systems to be used for navigation in a specific airspace. The use of RNP systems may therefore offer significant safety, operational and efficiency benefits.

On-board performance monitoring and alerting capabilities fulfill two needs, one on board the aircraft and one within the airspace design. The assurance of airborne system performance is implicit for RNAV operations. Based upon existing airworthiness criteria, RNAV systems are only required to demonstrate intended function and performance using explicit requirements that are broadly interpreted. The result is that while the nominal RNAV system performance can be very good, it is characterised by the variability of the system functionality and related flight performance. RNP systems provide a means to minimise variability and assure reliable, repeatable and predictable flight operations.

On-board performance monitoring and alerting allow the air crew to detect whether or not the RNP system satisfies the navigation performance required in the navigation specification. On-board performance monitoring and alerting relate to both lateral and longitudinal navigation performance.

On-board performance monitoring and alerting is concerned with the performance of the area navigation system.

- "on-board" explicitly means that the performance monitoring and alerting is affected on board the aircraft and not elsewhere, e.g. using a ground-based route adherence monitor or ATC surveillance. The monitoring element of on-board performance monitoring and alerting relates to flight technical error (FTE) and navigation system error (NSE). Path definition error (PDE) is constrained through database integrity and functional requirements on the defined path, and is considered negligible.
- "monitoring" refers to the monitoring of the aircraft's performance as regards its ability to determine positioning error and/or to follow the desired path.
- "alerting" relates to the monitoring: if the aircraft's navigation system does not perform well enough, this will be alerted to the air crew.

== RNAV and RNP specific functions ==
Performance-based flight operations are based on the ability to assure reliable, repeatable and predictable flight paths for improved capacity and efficiency in planned operations. The implementation of performance-based flight operations requires not only the functions traditionally provided by the RNAV system, but also may require specific functions to improve procedures, and airspace and air traffic operations. The system capabilities for established fixed radius paths, RNAV or RNP holding, and lateral offsets fall into this category.

=== Fixed radius paths ===
Fixed radius paths (FRP) take two forms:

1. the radius to fix (RF) leg type is one of the leg types that should be used when there is a requirement for a specific curved path radius in a terminal or approach procedure. The RF leg is defined by radius, arc length and fix. RNP systems supporting this leg type provide the same ability to conform to the track-keeping accuracy during the turn as in straight line segments. Bank angle limits for different aircraft types and winds aloft are taken into account in procedure design.
2. the fixed radius transition (FRT) is intended to be used in en-route procedures. These turns have two possible radii, 22.5 NM for high altitude routes (above FL195) and 15 NM for low altitude routes. Using such path elements in an RNAV route enables improvement in airspace usage through closely spaced parallel routes.

=== Fly-by turns ===
Fly-by turns are a key characteristic of an RNAV flight path. The RNAV system uses information on aircraft speed, bank angle, wind and track angle change to calculate a flight path turn that smoothly transitions from one path segment to the next. However, because the parameters affecting the turn radius can vary from one plane to another, as well as due to changing conditions in speed and wind, the turn initiation point and turn area can vary.

=== Holding pattern ===
The RNAV system facilitates the holding pattern specification by allowing the definition of the inbound course to the holding waypoint, turn direction and leg time or distance on the straight segments, as well as the ability to plan the exit from the hold. For RNP systems, further improvement in holding is available. These RNP improvements include fly-by entry into the hold, minimising the necessary protected airspace on the non-holding side of the holding pattern, consistent with the RNP limits provided. Where RNP holding is applied, a maximum of RNP 1 is suggested since less stringent values adversely affect airspace usage and design.

=== Offset flight path ===
RNAV systems may provide the capability for the flight crew to specify a lateral offset from a defined route. Generally, lateral offsets can be specified in increments of 1 NM up to 20 NM. When a lateral offset is activated in the RNAV system, the RNAV aircraft will depart the defined route and typically intercept the offset at a 45° or less angle. When the offset is cancelled, the aircraft returns to the defined route in a similar manner. Such offsets can be used both strategically i.e. fixed offset for the length of the route, or tactically i.e. temporarily. Most RNAV systems discontinue offsets in the terminal area or at the beginning of an approach procedure, at an RNAV hold, or during course changes of 90° or greater.

== Minimum navigation performance specifications ==
Aircraft operating in the North Atlantic airspace are required to meet a minimum navigation performance specification (MNPS). The MNPS specification has intentionally been excluded from PBN because of its mandatory nature and because future MNPS implementations are not envisaged.

== Future developments ==
It is likely that navigation applications will progress from 2-dimensional to 3-dimensional/4-dimensional applications, although time-scales and operational requirements are currently difficult to determine. Consequently, on-board performance monitoring and alerting is still to be developed in the vertical plane (vertical RNP) and ongoing work is aimed at harmonising longitudinal and linear performance requirements. Angular performance requirements associated with approach and landing will be included in the scope of PBN in the future. Similarly, specifications to support helicopter-specific navigation and holding functional requirements may also be included.

== Implementation examples ==
Several civil aviation authorities and airports have adopted PBN procedures to improve efficiency and reduce environmental impact. In the United States, the Federal Aviation Administration (FAA) has expanded PBN deployments as part of its NextGen modernization program. At the local level, airports such as Naples Airport in Florida have tested new satellite-based arrival and departure procedures to reduce noise exposure and fuel use while maintaining safety standards.

Beyond en-route and fixed-wing approach procedures, PBN concepts have been extended to rotorcraft operations and heliports. Satellite-based RNP AR and RNAV procedures tailored for helicopters have been used to provide instrument approaches to hospital heliports and low-level IFR routes in complex terrain, often using curved paths and radius-to-fix (RF) legs to maintain obstacle clearance while reducing noise and track miles. Procedure design organizations have also begun applying PBN techniques to vertiport concepts and advanced air mobility corridors, integrating RNP, GNSS augmentation and low-altitude airways into emerging vertical-lift operations.

== See also ==
- Index of aviation articles
