= Civil Aviation Administration (Bulgaria) =

Bulgarian governmental aviation agency

The Civil Aviation Administration (CAA) or the Directorate General "Civil Aviation Administration" (DG CAA; Bulgarian: Главна дирекция "Гражданска въздухоплавателна администрация", ГД ГВА) is an agency of the government of Bulgaria, headquartered in Sofia. It is within the Ministry of Transport, Information Technology and Communications.
