= Next Generation Data Communications =

Element of American aviation project NextGen

Next Generation (NextGen) Data Communications (Nexcom or Data 2023 Comm), an element of the Next Generation Air Transportation System, is intended to reduce controller-to-pilot communications and controller workload, while improving safety. NextGen comprises integrated and interlinked programs, portfolios, systems, policies, and procedures. NextGen modernized air traffic infrastructure in communications, navigation, surveillance, automation, and information management.

In the United States National Airspace System, communications with airborne aircraft is by voice. Flight revisions must be communicated through multiple change-of-course instructions or lengthy verbal reroute instructions. Vocal instructions must be repeated; are prone to errors; and are subject to data entry errors in the flight management system.

Adding air-to-ground and ground-to-ground data communications is expected to reduce controller-to-pilot communications and controller workload. Data communications should enable ground automated message generation and receipt, message routing and transmission, and direct communications with aircraft avionics.

Initially, data communications will be a supplemental means for communication between controllers and flight crews. Eventually, the majority of communications will be digital. This will speed communications and reduce errors.

NexCom will eventually replace existing Future Air Navigation System that is currently used primarily by transoceanic commercial airliners.

In financial years 2004 and 2005, approximately 20% of en route operational errors were voice communications related. Of those, 30% of the high severity operational errors were communications related.

== See also ==
- Controller–pilot data link communications (CPDLC)
- Future Air Navigation System
