= Computer Support Services =

Multi-national company providing technology solutions and professional services

CSSI Technologies, Inc.
- Type: Corporation
- Industry: Technology
- Founded: 1973
- Founder: Ronald Lewis (1936–2013)
- Headquarters: Lewisburg, Pennsylvania, United States
- Area served: North America
- Key people: David Cornelius (CEO)
- Products: AIDC products – barcode handheld scanners, industrial printers, mobile computers, labels and printing media, Microsoft Dynamics GP, Microsoft Power BI
- Services: Systems integration; Software development
- Number of employees: 20
- Website: CSSI Technologies, Inc.

CSSI Technologies, Inc., formerly Computer Support Services, Inc., is an IT systems integration and software development/customization company.

Computer Support Services, Inc. (CSSI) primarily provides supply chain solutions. CSSI headquarters is located in Lewisburg, Pennsylvania. CSSI is the parent company of CSSI Global Technologies located in Bangalore, India.

== History ==
The company was founded in 1973 as Computer Support Services by Ronald P. Lewis to provide companies with data processing services. Computer Support Services, also known as RPL & Co. At that time, it was incorporated in 1978. In 1980, the company established itself as a service-oriented company under new owners, Delmar R. Ritter and David L. Cornelius. With sales reaching $2.4 million, the company added a third owner, Thomas A. Erickson, in 1989.

The company acquired Quality Data Products of Williamsport, Pennsylvania, from David Franklin, in 1993. In 2011, CSSI opened a subsidiary, CSSI Global Technologies.

In 2018, the company announced the change of the company's name to CSSI Technologies, and the divestment of its Core Integrator software business, which is independently operated as CoreIntegrator, LLC.

== Current executives ==
- David Cornelius, CEO
- Joe Tosolt, President
