= National Airspace System =

US airspace, navigation facilities and airports

The National Airspace System (NAS) is the airspace, navigation facilities and airports of the United States along with their associated information, services, rules, regulations, policies, procedures, personnel and equipment. It includes components shared jointly with the military. It is one of the most complex aviation systems in the world, and services air travel in the United States and over large portions of the world's oceans.

== Organization ==
A flight through the NAS typically begins and ends at an airport which may be controlled (by a tower) or uncontrolled. On departure, the aircraft is in one of five of the six classes of airspace administered by the Federal Aviation Administration (FAA), and different flight rules apply to each class. Depending on the class of airspace and flight conditions, communication with air traffic controllers may or may not be required. Operation of each flight is always the responsibility of the pilot in command, but air traffic controllers give instructions for sequencing and safety as needed. When a controlled flight is airborne, control passes from the tower controller who authorized the takeoff, if the airport is controlled. The next step is typically Terminal Radar Approach Control or TRACON which may be identified as "approach" or "departure".

Air Route Traffic Control Centers' coverage areas, names, and three-letter FAA identifiers

Between the sectors administered by TRACONs are 20 contiguous areas of US airspace above 18,000 feet, each managed by an Air Route Traffic Control Center (ARTCC) typically referred to on the radio as "Center". A flight is handed off from one Center to another until it descends near its destination, when control is transferred to the TRACON serving the destination, and ultimately to the tower controller serving the airport. Some airports have no TRACON around them, so control goes directly to or from a Center, and some flights are low enough and short enough that control is kept within one or more TRACONs without ever being passed to Center.

Approximately 14,500 air traffic controllers, 4,500 aviation safety inspectors, and 5,800 technicians operate and maintain services for the NAS. It has more than 19,000 airports and 600 air traffic control facilities. In all, there are 41,000 NAS operational facilities. In addition, there are over 71,000 pieces of equipment, ranging from radar systems to communication relay stations. On average, about 45,000 flights use NAS services each day.

== Developments ==
As of February 2015 the NAS is transitioning to a new system known as NextGen, which applies non-radar surveillance of aircraft equipped with GPS satellite-based navigation systems continuously reporting their location. Aircraft also receive the broadcast location of others nearby, which improves safety. The system also allows pilots to use more precise and efficient landing paths, saving time and fuel. NextGen is being phased in piece by piece. A central element is the wider use of performance-based navigation (PBN), including area navigation (RNAV) and required navigation performance (RNP) routes and approach procedures designed around satellite navigation and onboard navigation performance monitoring. These procedures are used not only on high-altitude en route structures and major airline hubs, but also at smaller airports and heliports, supporting operations such as regional airline services and helicopter air ambulance flights in complex terrain or congested airspace.

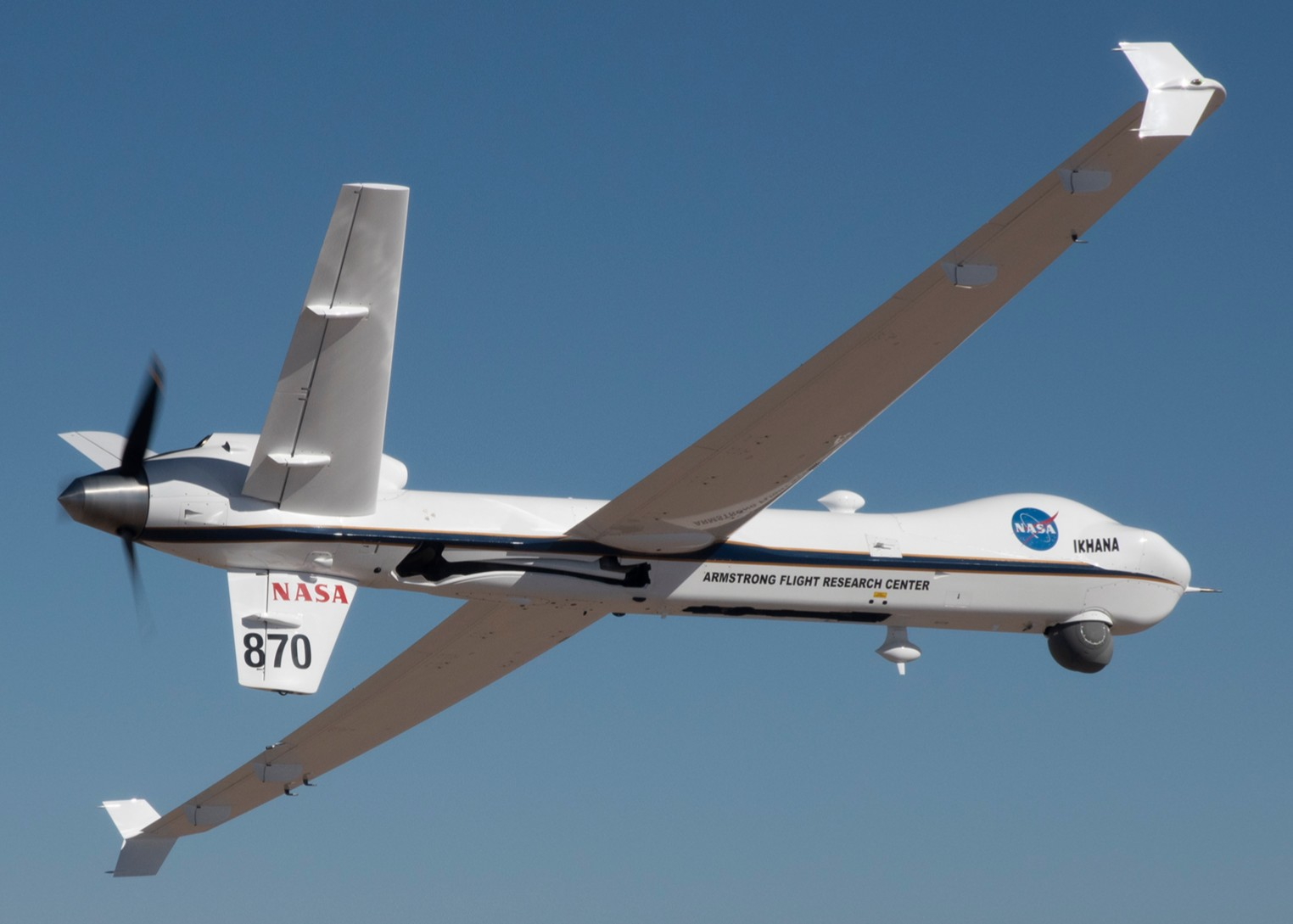
NASA's remotely-piloted Ikhana prepared for its 2018 flight through public airspace

In June 2018, NASA flew a 36 feet long by 66-foot (11 by 20-meter) demilitarised MQ-9 Predator named Ikhana for six hours through multiple classes (A, D, E) of the NAS with no chase aircraft, controlled from Armstrong Flight Research Center. It was the first remotely-piloted flight through civilian airspace with no chase aircraft and marked a step towards unmanned aircraft operations in civil airspace.

== Airspace classification ==
In the U.S., airspace consists of classes A, B, C, D, E, and G. The NAS includes both controlled and uncontrolled airspace.

Class A begins and includes 18,000 ft. MSL and continues up to 60,000 ft. MSL. It is the most controlled airspace and requires a pilot to carry an Instrument Flight Rating and proper clearance no matter what type of aircraft is being flown. Pilots are also required to change their altimeter settings to 29.92 inHg to ensure all pilots within the airspace have the same readings in order to ensure proper altitude separation.

Class B airspace extends from the surface up to 10,000 ft. AGL and is the area above and around the busiest airports (e.g., LAX, MIA, CVG) and is also heavily controlled. A side view of Class B airspace resembles an upside-down wedding cake with three layers becoming bigger toward the top. Class B's layers are designed individually to meet the needs of the airport they overlay. Pilots must also receive clearance to enter the Class B airspace but Visual Flight Rules may be used, unlike in Class A airspace. Class B airspace corresponds to the area formerly known as a Terminal Control Area or TCA.

Class C airspace reaches from the surface to 4,000 ft. AGL above the airport which it surrounds. Class C airspace only exists over airports which have an operational control tower, are serviced by a radar approach control, and have a certain number of instrument flight operations. Class C is also individually designed for airports but usually covers a surface area of about 5 nautical miles around the airport up to 1,200 ft AGL. At 1,200 ft. the airspace extends to 10 nautical miles in diameter which continues to 4,000 ft. Pilots are required to establish two-way radio communications with the ATC facility providing air traffic control service to the area before entering the airspace. Within Class C, Visual and Instrument pilots are separated.

Class D airspace exists from the surface to 2,500 ft. AGL above an airport. Class D airspace only surrounds airports with an operational control tower. Class D airspace is also tailored to meet the needs of the airport. Pilots are required to establish and maintain two-way radio communications with the ATC facility providing air traffic control services prior to entering the airspace. Pilots using Visual Flight Reference must be vigilant for traffic as there is no positive separation service in the airspace. This airspace roughly corresponds to the former Airport Traffic Area.

Class E airspace is the airspace that lies between Classes A, B, C, and D. Class E extends from either the surface or the roof of the underlying airspace and ends at the floor of the controlled airspace above. Class E exists for those planes transitioning from the terminal to en route state. It also exists as an area for instrument pilots to remain under ATC control without flying in a controlled airspace. Under visual flight conditions, Class E can be considered uncontrolled airspace.

Airports without operational control towers are uncontrolled airfields. Pilots in these areas are responsible for position and separation and may use a specified Common Traffic Advisory Frequency (CTAF) or UNICOM for that airport, although no-radio flight is also permitted.

Class G airspace is uncontrolled airspace which extends from the surface to either 700 or 1,200 ft. AGL depending on the floor of the overlying Class E, or to the floor of Class A where there is no overlying Class E. In the vicinity of an uncontrolled airport, the CTAF for that airport is used for radio communication among pilots. In remote areas other frequencies such as MULTICOM are used. No towers or in-flight control services are provided although communications may be established with flight service stations which are not part of the NAS and advisory service may be available from ARTCC.

== See also ==
- Aviation System Performance Metrics
- Space Data Integrator
