= 24-bit (disambiguation) =

24-bit is a reference to a 24-bit length of data or memory addressing.

24-bit may also refer to:

- 24-bit color, color data types
- 24-bit, a bit depth used in digital audio; see Audio bit depth
- ICAO 24-bit address, a unique ID given to aircraft using an Aviation transponder interrogation mode
- 24-bit hex code, data used in aeronautics transponders
