= Transponder landing system =

All-weather, precision landing system

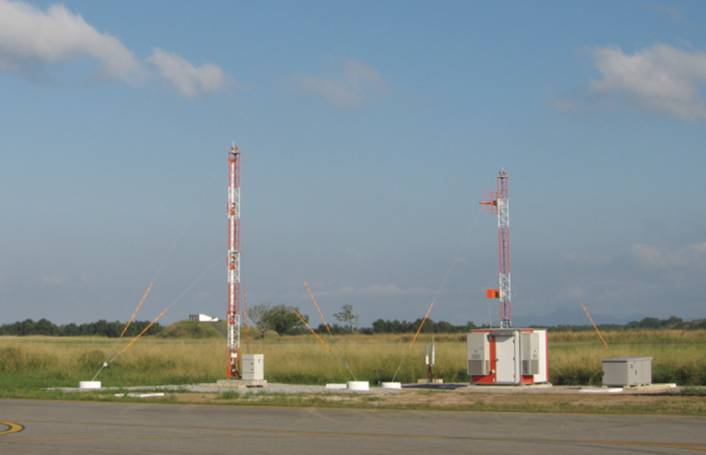
TLS electronics shelter, elevation sensor and uplink antennas – Santa Cruz Air Force Base, Rio de Janeiro, Brazil, August 2009

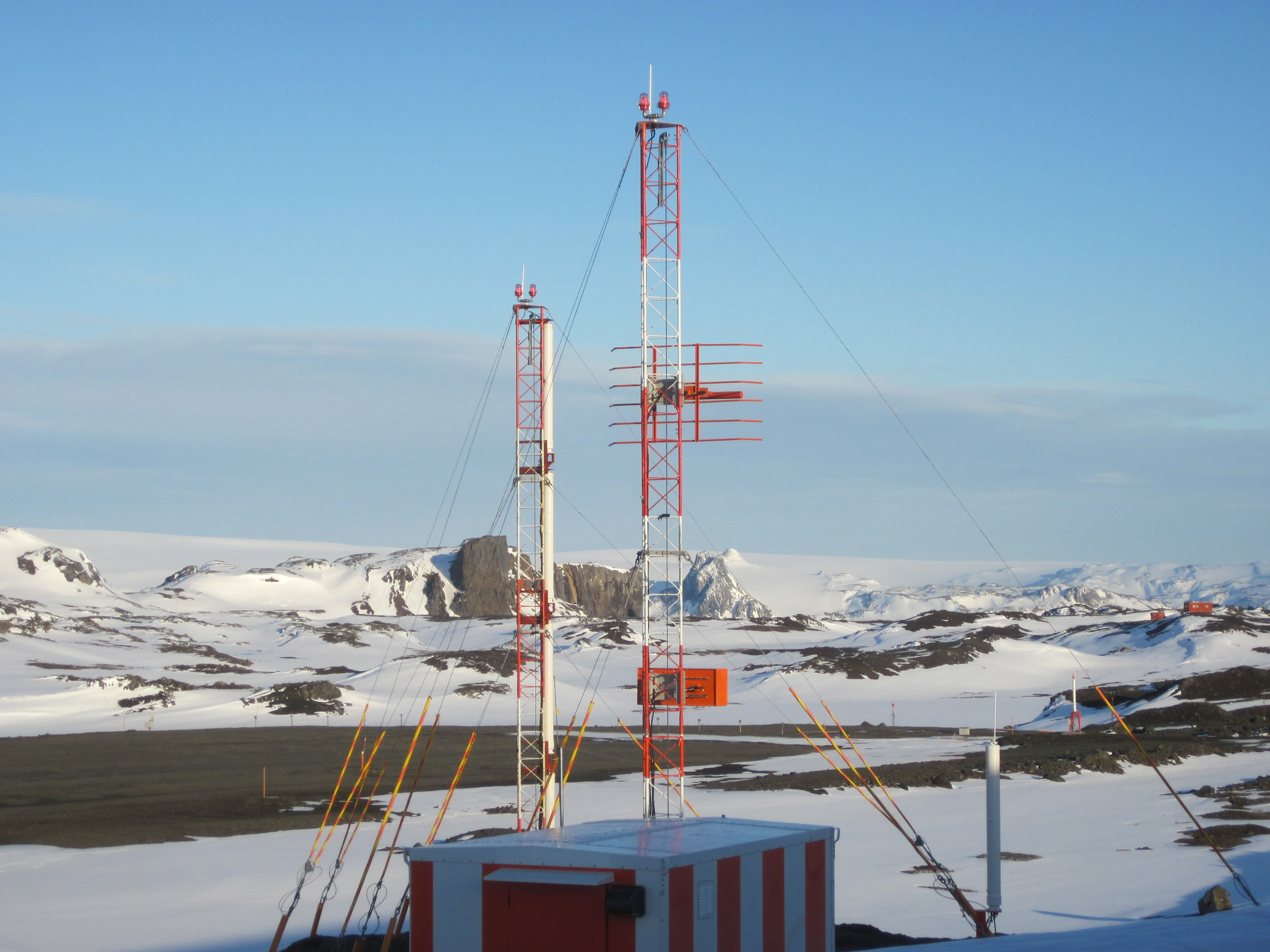
TLS at Teniente Rodolfo Marsh Martin Aerodrome November 2010, Base Presidente Eduardo Frei Montalva Antarctica

A transponder landing system (TLS) is an all-weather, precision landing system that uses existing airborne transponder and instrument landing system (ILS) equipment to create a precision approach at a location where an ILS would normally not be available.

== Description ==
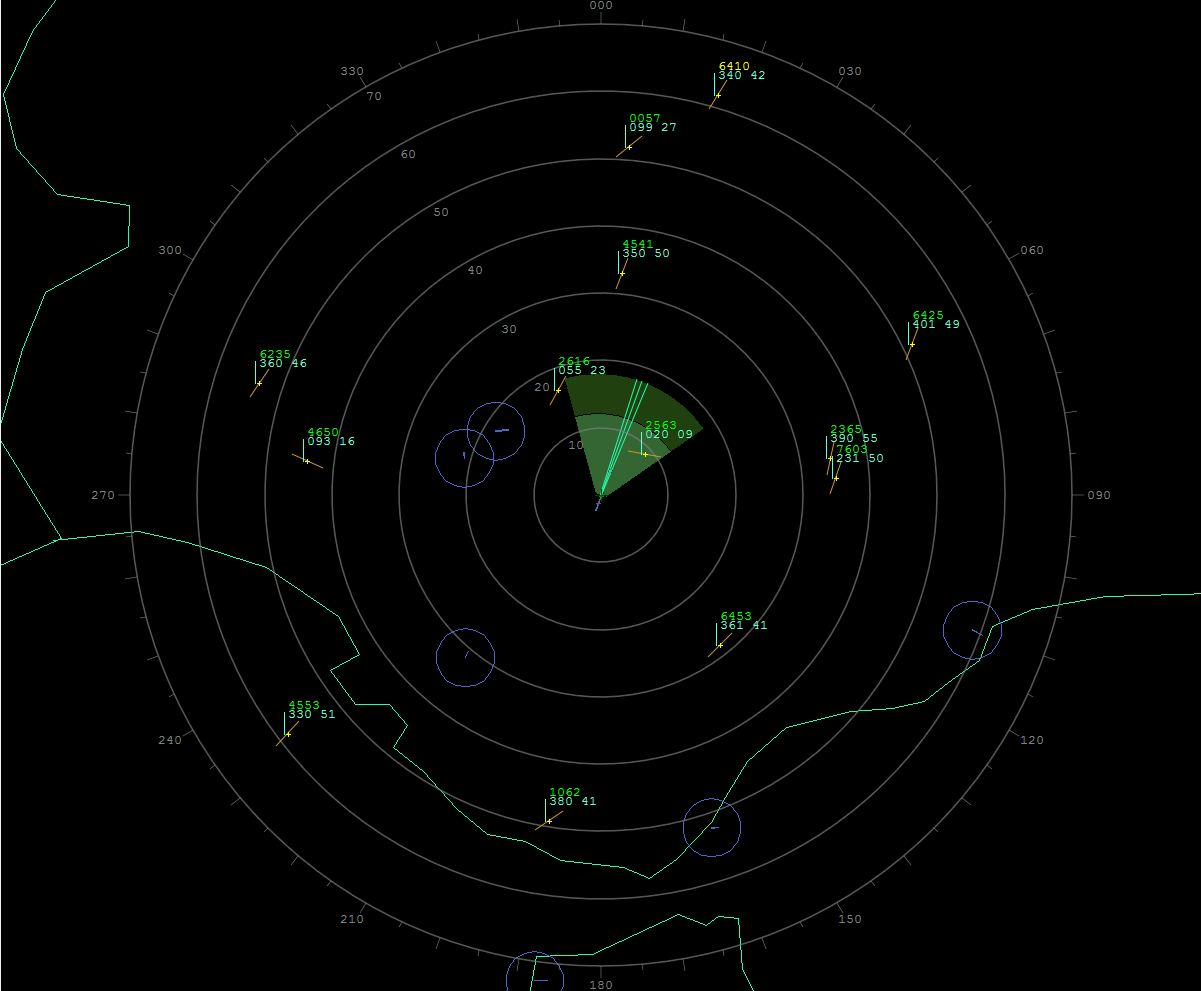
Aircraft position tracks over southern Spain as determined by TLS

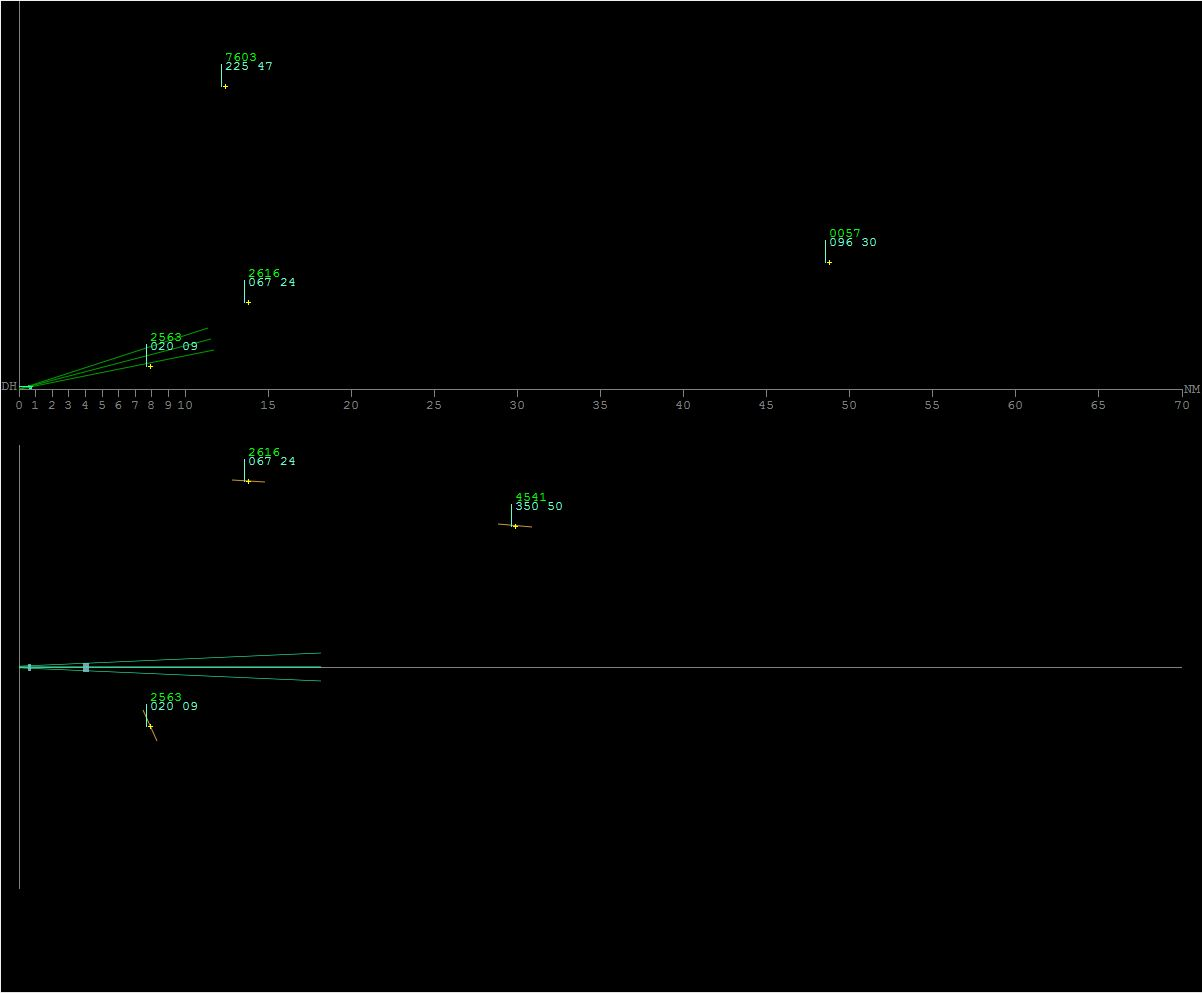
PAR Format: All aircraft positions within the display field of view are depicted

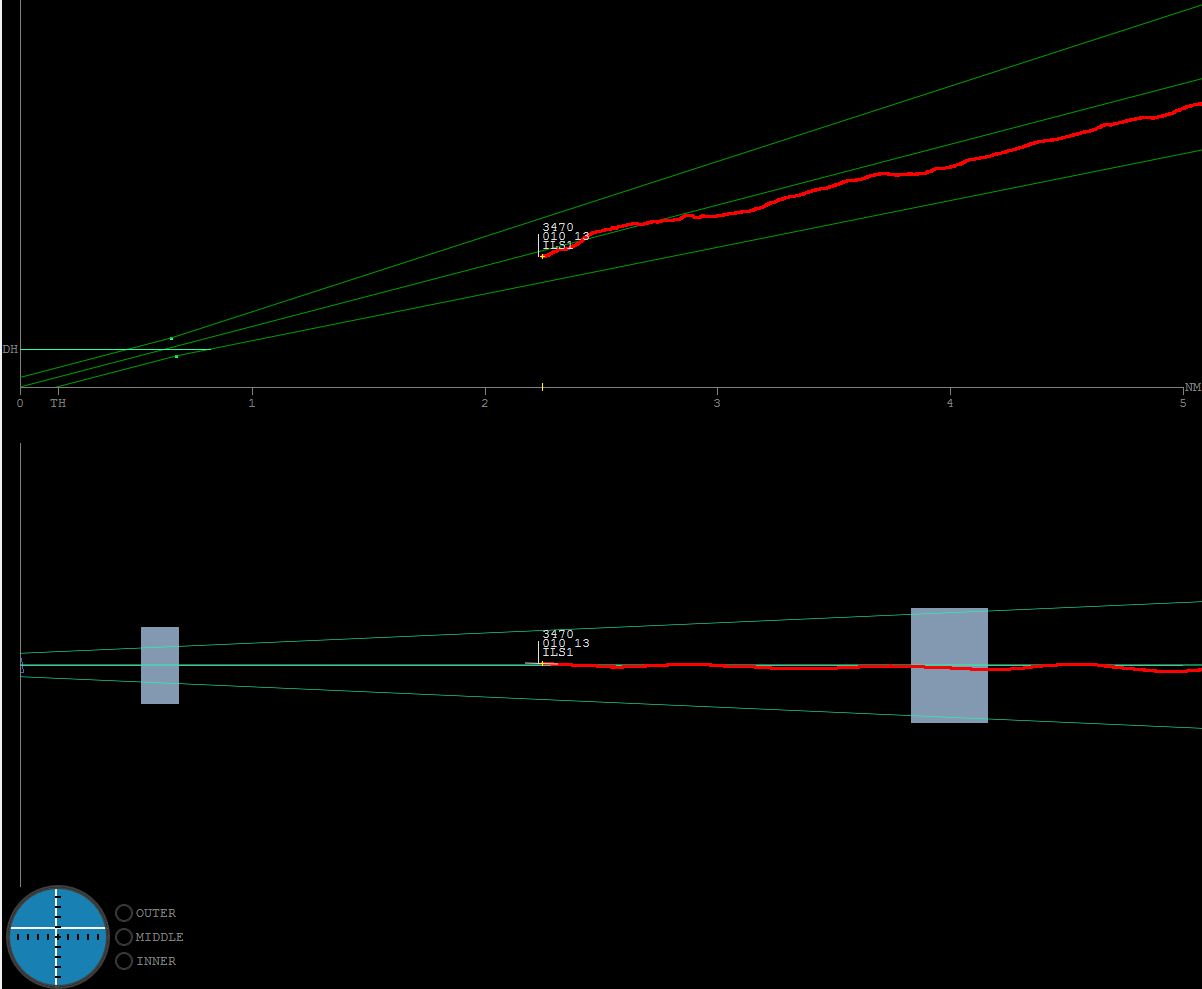
PAR format: Single aircraft may be selected for each of the operator consoles to provide talk-down guidance

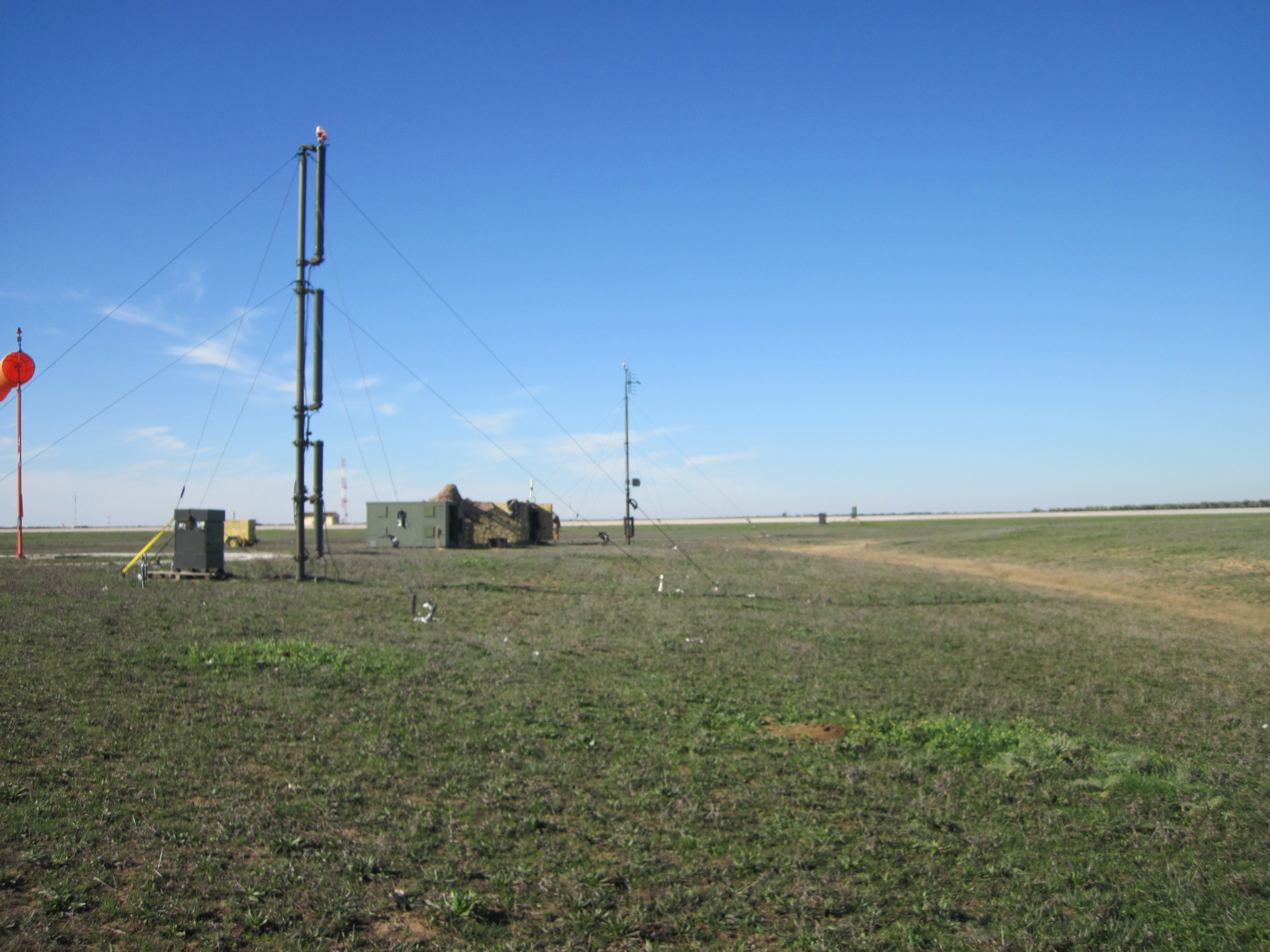
Transportable TLS (TTLS) owned by the Spanish Air Force deployed at an undisclosed location in 2010

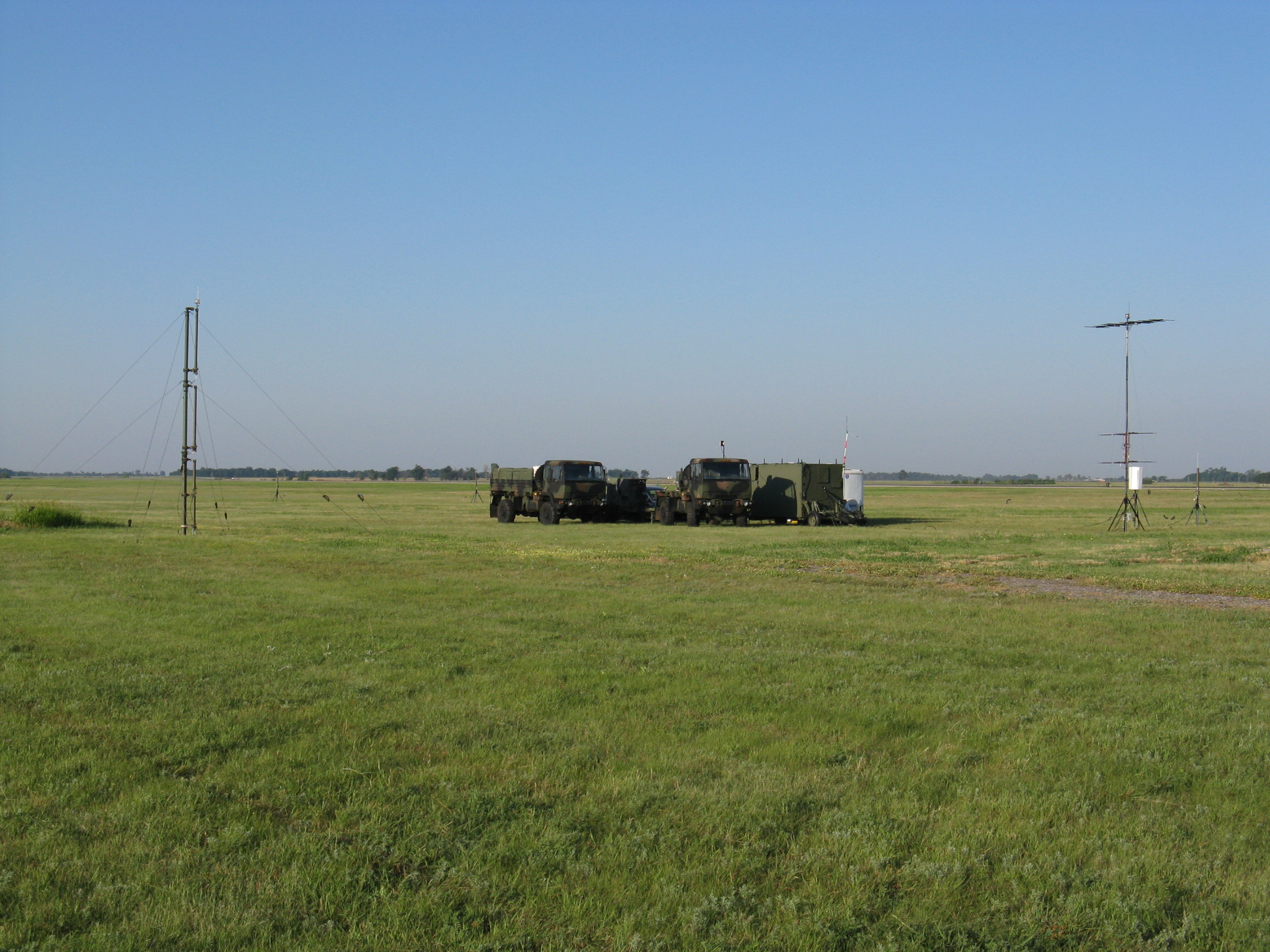
US Air Force Transportable TLS (TTLS) deployed at an undisclosed location in 2010

Conventional ILS systems broadcast using a number of "single purpose" antennas. The localizer array consists of 8 to 14 or more antenna elements and is typically located 2000+ feet from the runway approach threshold, which is often beyond the departure end of the runway and provides a fan-shaped signal for azimuth direction (side to side). The other antenna array is located beside the runway and provides elevation to indicate a standard glideslope. This complex set of antennas is expensive to install and maintain and is often difficult to site in areas with uneven terrain or obstacles that could interfere with its guidance signals.

== Function ==
The TLS facility interrogates the transponders of all aircraft within 100 nautical miles (190 km). After receiving a response, TLS determines the aircraft's location using three sets of antenna arrays: one for horizontal position using monopulse techniques, the other for vertical monopulse and a third for trilateration. TLS then calculates the position of all aircraft using the transponder replies and converts that into real-time guidance for an aircraft cleared for approach based on its position relative to the desired approach path. The position tracks for all aircraft in the TLS service volume are displayed on an ATC monitor similar to a secondary surveillance radar but with an increased update rate and higher accuracy. For an aircraft conducting an instrument approach, the TLS will transmit horizontal and vertical guidance signals to the ILS receiver and cockpit avionics that are identical to those of an ILS. The signals will thus appear to emanate from fixed locations where ILS antennas are typically installed. However, TLS guidance is not a function of antenna location - the TLS can provide guidance from "virtual emanation points" that may be anywhere as required by an instrument approach procedure but are configured in the TLS software. This allows the TLS to support multiple approach procedures at a given airport, including steeper glide slope angles for rotary-wing aircraft or increased obstacle clearance, with a single complete system installed adjacent to runway threshold. The TLS will also produce marker beacon-like audio to indicate distance from the runway, but without the requirement for physical equipment. All the pilot has to do is follow the same ATC protocols required for a conventional ILS approach. Any aircraft conducting a PAR-type approach can be viewed on the TLS PAR format console displaying azimuth and elevation. Up to four different aircraft may be viewed independently on four separate consoles to assist PAR controllers with talk-down approaches.

== Uses ==
The TLS is designed to be installed at airfields where a conventional ILS cannot physically or feasibly operate, or where satellite-based navigation is unreliable. These include short runways or those with obstacles or uneven terrain along or adjacent to the approach path, or those with water or real estate constraints at either end. These also include airfields in the Arctic circle or in close proximity to the equator where satellite-based navigation is compromised due to ionospheric conditions. The TLS operates with no reliance on satellite navigation and therefore is impervious to intentional or unintentional interruption or compromise of satellite communications. TLS is an active surveillance and tracking system and its approach procedures are configured in software vs. being dependent on physical antenna locations, so its siting criteria are flexible and the entire system can be collocated on a small footprint adjacent to the runway threshold and operates on a single power supply. TLS approaches can also be designed using ILS, GLS, or RNP criteria or any combination thereof, and therefore will support curved and segmented approaches not possible with a conventional ILS.

The TLS has been FAA certified for Cat.I ILS usage since 1998 and FAA Order 8200.27 specifies the flight inspection procedure for TLS installations. The TLS also meets all ICAO performance specifications for a Cat.I ILS.

== Benefits ==
One of the primary benefits of TLS is the ability to provide precision ILS guidance where terrain is sloping or uneven. Reflections can create an uneven glide path for ILS causing unwanted needle deflections. Additionally, since the ILS signals are pointed in one direction by the positioning of the arrays, ILS only supports straight-in approaches. TLS supports approach over rough terrain and provides the ability to offset the approach center-line.

With TLS, the localizer course can have a tailored width at the runway threshold (700 feet and 5 degrees typically) regardless of the runway length. The localizer width characteristics can be selected by the approach designer whereas with an ILS the localizer width is determined by the localizer antenna placement which is usually a consequence of runway length.

For military users, TLS also provides a Precision Approach Radar (PAR) graphic display of aircraft position compared to the desired approach course in order for a PAR operator to provide talk-down guidance to the pilot. Since the TLS operates using the long range band of SSR (1030/1090 MHz) there is no rain fade such as experienced with a traditional PAR that uses primary radar. For a traditional PAR, the ability to track the aircraft position is dependent on the aircraft radar cross section.

TLS is based on transponder multilateration and trilateration and consequently tracks all aircraft that respond to the interrogations. Omnidirectional antenna surveillance coverage of the TLS extends to 100 nautical miles.

The TLS functions using airborne equipment that is currently widely used by the aviation industry. TLS uses the existing Mode 3/A/C/S transponder equipment to determine the aircraft's position. It then transmits the correct signal on the same frequencies used for the current ILS system. All the pilot is required to do is wait for clearance from ATC for the TLS approach and then tune an ILS receiver to the appropriate frequency. TLS uses equipment most airplanes already have.

== Drawbacks ==
The TLS simulates an ILS signal that is specific to one aircraft's location on a given ILS frequency. The system can provide guidance to 4 aircraft simultaneously on discrete frequencies, but only those aircraft properly cleared for a TLS approach will receive proper guidance. Other aircraft that erroneously tune to a TLS frequency without proper clearance will not receive correct guidance. Operationally from the pilot's perspective, this is no different from conventional ILS systems. The TLS does require a human operator to acquire the aircraft at the system display console and instruct the system to provide guidance based on its transponder code, so there is an operational difference from an ATC perspective.

== Variations ==
The TLS is available in several transportable configurations for rapid deployment in defense or other temporary applications. The entire system can be transported in a standard 20' Conex container which can also be used as the center of operations, or on a single 463L master pallet. The system can be transported by truck, ship, or any suitable transport aircraft such as a C-130 or C-17, and can also be airlifted by helicopter. The transportable systems can be unpacked and installed to full operational capacity in several hours by 2 trained technicians.

== See also ==
- Distance measuring equipment (DME)
- Instrument flight rules (IFR)
- Non-directional beacon (NDB)
- Precision approach radar
- Secondary surveillance radar
- Transponder (aeronautics)
- VHF omni-directional range (VOR)
