= Secondary surveillance radar =

Radar system used in air traffic control

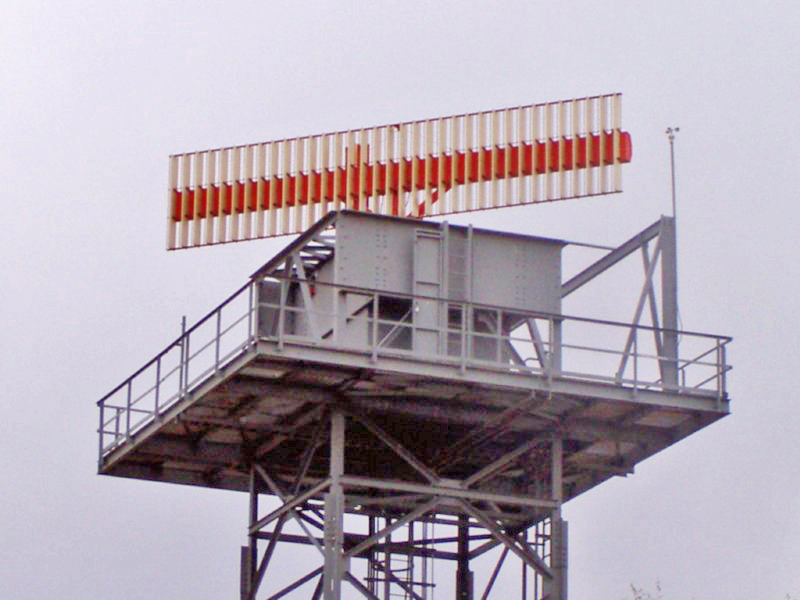
Large vertical array - monopulse secondary surveillance (LVA-MSSR) antenna array of Deutsche Flugsicherung at Neubrandenburg in Mecklenburg

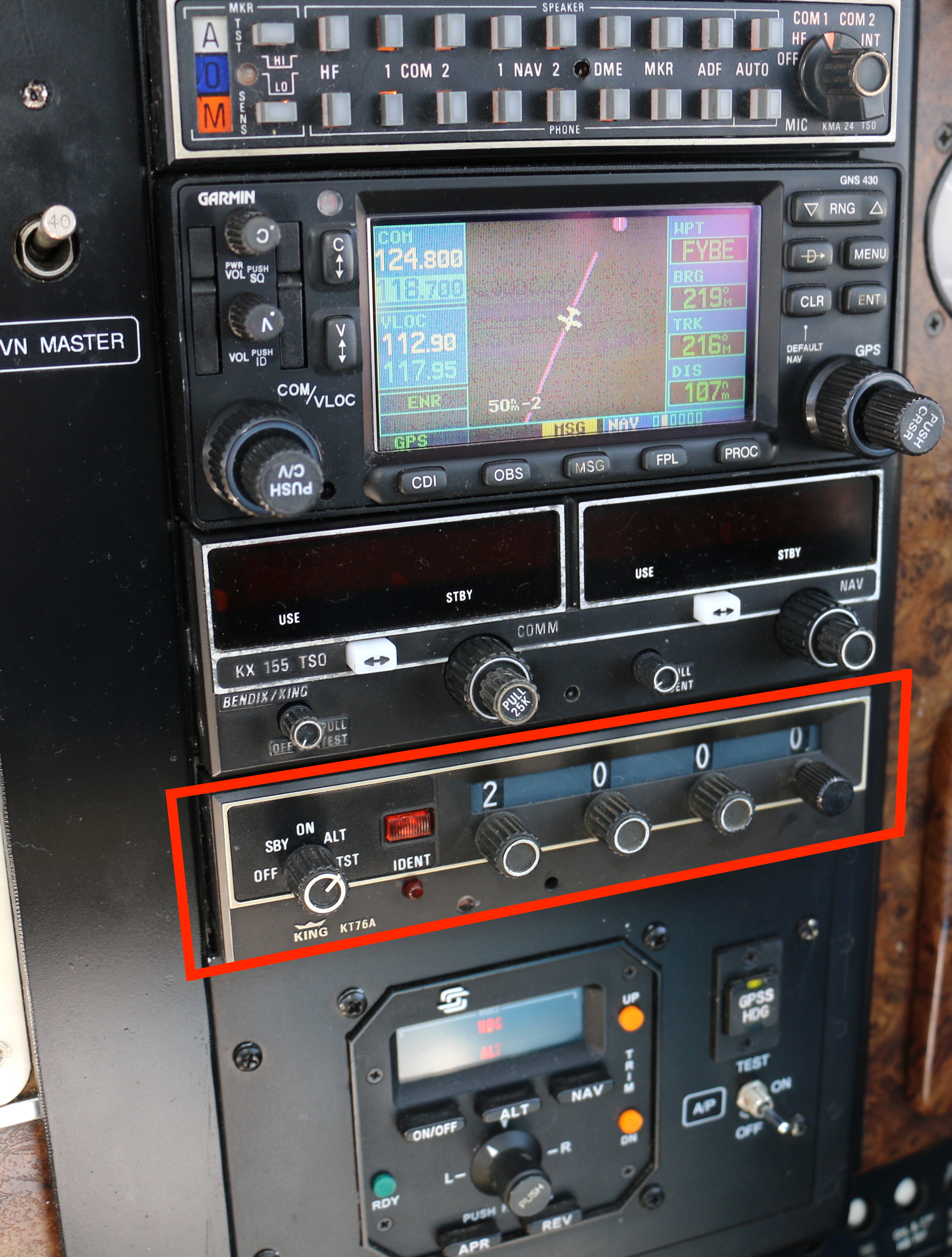
Mode A and C Transponder in a private aircraft squawking 2000 mounted below COM/NAV equipment

Secondary surveillance radar (SSR) is a radar system used in air traffic control (ATC) that, unlike primary surveillance radar (PSR) systems that measure the bearing and distance of targets using the detected reflections of radio signals, relies on targets equipped with a radar transponder, that reply in the same Mode that an interrogation pulse code corresponds to, by transmitting a pulse telegram containing, e.g. the identity code as a 4 digit octal number in Mode A, the aircraft's altitude from the barometric pressure sensor of an aircraft in Mode C and a unique 24-bit address and further information in other Modes. SSR is based on the military identification, friend or foe (IFF) initially standardized in the U.S. and later adopted by NATO; however, the first IFF systems date back to World War II. SSR Mode A, C and S are compatible with IFF Mode 3A, C and S. SSR Mode B and D are no longer specified in ICAO Annex 10. Additional SSR Mode S based systems are ADS-B, TCAS, multilateration systems (MLAT) and satellite based surveillance using ADS-B messages.

== Overview ==
=== Primary radar ===
The rapid wartime development of primary surveillance radar (PSR) had obvious applications for Air Defense (AD) for the detection of approaching enemies as well as air traffic control as a means of providing continuous detection of surveillance of air traffic disposition. Precise knowledge of the positions of enemy aircraft allowed AD to guide fighter aircraft towards unfriendly aircraft, while for ATC it permitted a reduction in the normal procedural separation standards which in turn promised considerable increases in the efficiency of the airways system as well as during approach to air fields for ground-controlled approach (GCA) by using precision approach radar (PAR). ^{7.8, p.248 ff.}

PSR can detect and report the position of any object that reflects a sufficient amount of the transmitted radar energy back towards a PSR Radar sensor. Depending on the PSR design moving and/or stationary objects, e.g. aircraft, ships, birds, rain-clouds, other weather phenomena, land features or man made objects, can be detected. For air traffic control purposes this is both an advantage and a disadvantage. The advantage is that targets do not have to co-operate, they only have to be within its coverage and be able to reflect radio waves, the disadvantage a PSR Radar Sensor can only measure the slant range distance between the PSR sensor and an object. The azimuth is derived from the azimuth the antenna is pointing to. Specialized 3D-Radars allow within limits the detection of the aircraft height. While this allows to detect the position of the targets relative to the PSR sensor, it does not allow to identify if they are friend or foe, or which aircraft has been detected.

When primary radar was the only type of radar available, the correlation of individual radar returns with specific aircraft typically was achieved by the controller observing a directed turn by the aircraft. Primary radar is still used by ATC as primary means surveillance as backup in case a detection of aircraft by SSR failed, e.g. because the SSR detection failure / complementary system to secondary surveillance radar, for cases when aircraft is not equipped with SSR, has a defective transponder, or when the transponder was intentionally manipulated or destroyed.^{,}^{,}

=== Secondary radar ===
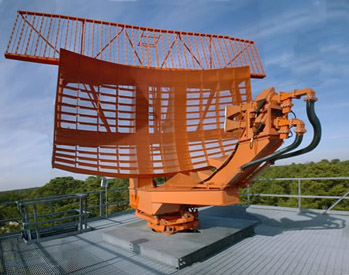
Secondary surveillance LVA antenna array (flat rectangle, top) mounted on an ASR-9 primary airport surveillance radar parabolic dish antenna (curved rectangle, bottom).

The need to be able to identify aircraft more easily and reliably led to another wartime radar development, the identification, friend or foe (IFF) systems, which had been created as a means of positively identifying friendly aircraft from unknowns. The first systems, Mark I and Mark II, were limited to receiving a transmitted pulse and retransmitting it after amplification. Transponder were only activated when ordered to.

Starting with the Mark III system the reply was transmitted in a separate frequency band (157 MHz to 187 MHz), which required a receiver for this band in the Radar equipment.

In 1943 a joint British-American project of the United States Naval Research Laboratory under the lead of Vivian Bowden developed the IFF Mark V, which was adopted for mass production under the designation United Nations beacons (UNB). The IFF Mark V system already used the L-Band in the frequency range between 950 MHz to 1150 MHz. After further development it became to Mark X, but still was a very basic system, which used 12 channels with a frequency separation of 17 MHz between the channels, but did not yet allow individual identification for an aircraft.

Further development led to the IFF Mark X system with Mode 1, Mode 2 und Mode 3 which used pulse coded interrogations to specify the Mode and pulse coded replies that provided 64 individual identifications for aircraft. The U.S. specifications were provided in 1952 to NATO for adoption and use of the system by NATO states.^{,} The X was intended to be a placeholder for a at a later time to be determined final designation, but would later become the number 10 from in the roman numeral system. As a consequence new versions were then called Mode XI and Mode XII. IFF Mark XI was however only used for a short time for the use of coded interrogations and replies^{AN/APX-35} ^{Transponder} and nearly directly to IFF Mark XII. The addition of the selective identification feature (SIF) to provide selective identification of aircraft, is the equivalent to the later by ICAO specified SPI pulse and was provided in 1959 by the U.S. to NATO states.

Based on IFF Mark X the International Civil Aviation Organization (ICAO) began at the 5th ComDiv (Communications Division) Meeting in Montreal 1954 with the standardization of the SSR (secondary surveillance radar) system. ^{p. IV-4 ff.} An important decision was the selection of 1030.0 MHz for the interrogation- and 1090.0 MHz for the reply-frequency to ensure a interference free coexistence to the in 1950 adopted first Distance Measuring Equipment, which operated in the band 960 MHz to 1215 MHz. Interrogations were transmitted on 10 channels between 936.5 MHz und 986.0 MHz und Replies between 1188.5 MHz and 1211.0 MHz. Therefore SSR had sufficient frequency separation to the first ICAO DME system from 1950.

The declassified TACAN standards were used by ICAO to define today's DME/N (narrow spectrum), which utilized however the complete frequency range between 962 MHz to 1213 MHz in 1 MHz-steps. DME/N was standardized by ICAO in Annex 10, edition 6.^{Nr. IV-4} To avoid interference between DME/N, TACAN and SSR, the DME/N channel were the interrogation-, the reply- or both frequencies were within the receiver bandwidth of SSR interrogator and transponder receiver were restricted from use, when a land has SSR equipment in operation. ^{S.3-1} Further parameter like e. g. SLS (side lobe suppression) were adopted by the 7th ComDiv Meeting in 1962.

The ICAO SSR system Mode A to D interrogations, differ from IFF Mode 1 and 2 only in the use of a different pulse pair separation between the interrogation pulses. The IFF Mode 1 pulse coded reply and later the initial SSR Mode A reply used only 2 Octal numbers and therefore provided only 64 different ID codes for aircraft identification. ^{Nr.} ^{3.9.3.2} IFF Mode 2 and SSR Mode A (IFF Mode 3A) used 4 Octal numbers that allowed for 4096 different ID Codes to identify aircraft. ^{Nr. 3.8.6.2.1}

While the ICAO designation for the SSR system Mode A to D in the U.S. it is mostly referenced as the air traffic control radar beacon system (ATCRBS). From the 4 interrogation Modes A to D, today only Mode A for Identification and Mode C for the barometric air pressure from the aircraft transponder remains standardized by ICAO for international use. Civil and military aircraft need to be fitted with operational Mode A and C capable transponder to allow detection by SSR- and IFF-interrogator. The transponder is a combined radio receiver and transmitter, which receives its interrogations on 1030 MHz and transmits the replies with the requested information for a Mode on 1090 MHz. The target aircraft transponder replies to signals from an interrogator (usually, but not necessarily, a ground station often co-located with a primary surveillance radar) by transmitting a coded reply signal containing the requested information for the used interrogation Mode.

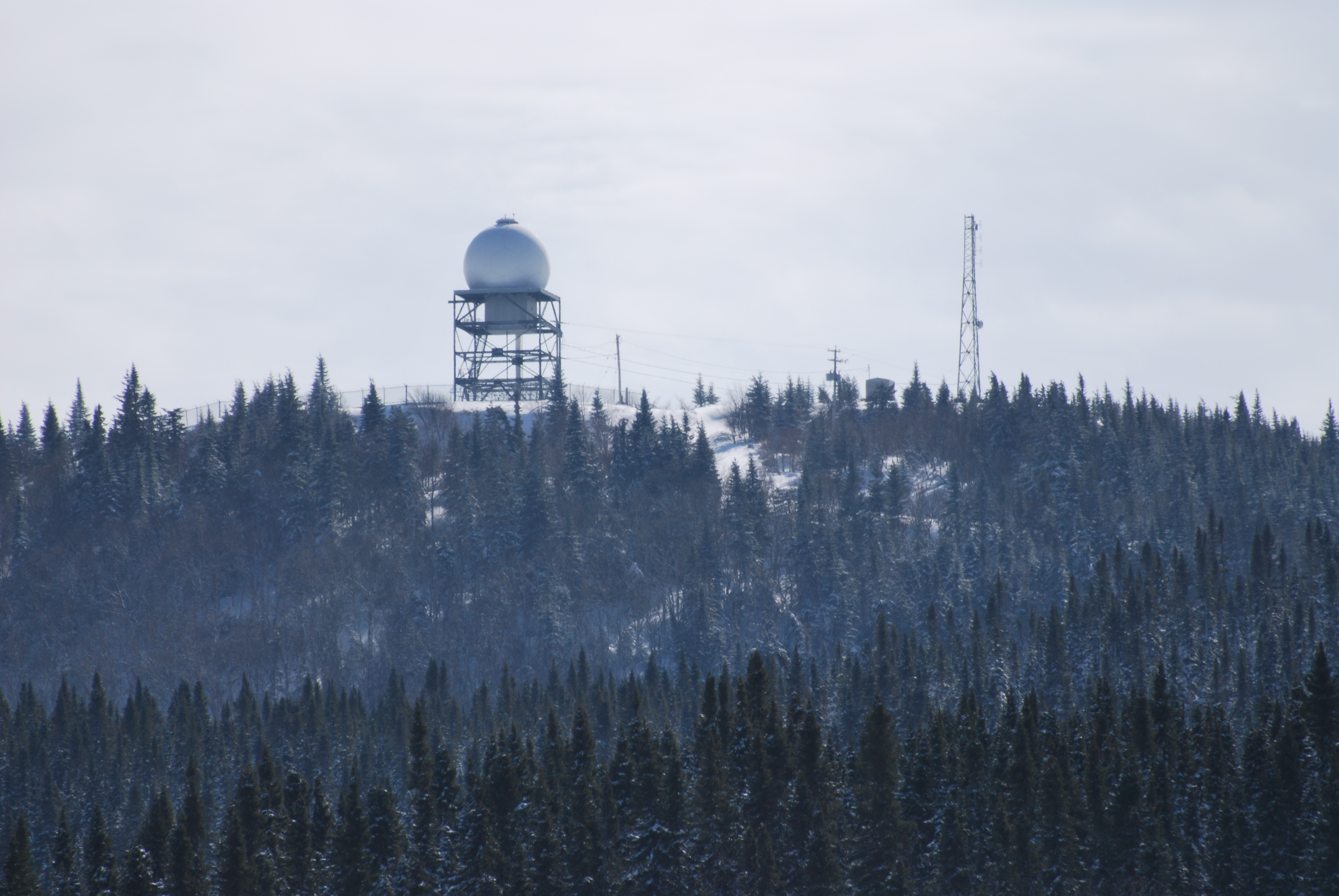
Independent secondary surveillance radar (ISSR), designation YMT, north of Chibougamau, Quebec, Canada

While 4096 ID-codes for identification seemed sufficient at the beginning, the increased number of aircraft that are equipped with an operational transponder and the increasing number of AD, civil and military ATC, which each required their own batch of ID-codes out of the 4096 available ID codes, soon overcame the supply needed for day to day control. The U.S. Federal Aviation Administration (FAA) started with the development for a more refined SSR system that would allow for future growth, e. g. additional systems to help avoid airborne collisions. During the Development of the new Mode in the U.S. the system was called DABS (discrete address beacon system).

It would take however until 1987 until the new developed Mode was also accepted, standardized and published by ICAO in Annex 10, Volume I, Amendment 67. The new Mode was dubbed Mode S for Selective and was foreseen to allow each aircraft to have its own 24 Bit address. Furthermore, Mode S would allow to selectively interrogate only one aircraft or all aircraft (all call), to transmit additional information relevant for ATC and later a system to avoid airborne collisions, and to enable use as Data Link between Mode S capable aircraft transponders and ground interrogators.

Each state was allocated a number band of 24 Bit addresses for allocation to civil and military aviation. However, while during standardization of Mode S addresses with 24 Bits seemed sufficient to provide all civil commercial aviation (CA) and military aircraft with their own Id, today's increasing number of general aviation (GA) aircraft, including e.g. glider, equipped with Mode S-capable transponder, the growing number of UAVs flying in Mode S airspaces, and the growing use for identification of ground vehicle equipped with a Mode S ADS-B-capable transponder via an airport based MLAT (multilateration) systems, e. g. with more than 300 vehicles per airport, already shows the limits of the 24 Bit address range, which could not have been foreseen during definition of the Mode S system.

Both the civilian SSR and the military IFF have become much more complex than their war-time ancestors, but remain compatible with each other, not least to allow military aircraft to operate in civil airspace. SSR can provide much more detailed information, for example, the aircraft altitude, as well as enabling the direct exchange of data between aircraft for collision avoidance. Most SSR systems rely on Mode C transponders, which report the aircraft pressure altitude. The pressure altitude is independent of the pilot's altimeter setting, thus preventing false altitude transmissions if altimeter is adjusted incorrectly. Air traffic control systems re-calculate reported pressure altitudes to true altitudes, based on their own pressure references, if necessary.

Given its primary military role of reliably identifying friends, IFF has more secure (encrypted) messages to prevent "spoofing" by the enemy, and is used on many types of military platforms including air, sea and land vehicles.

=== Standards and specifications ===
The International Civil Aviation Organization (ICAO) is a specialized agency of the United Nations headquartered in Montreal, Quebec, Canada. It publishes annexes to the Convention on International Civil Aviation. Annex 10 of this convention addresses Standards and Recommended Practices for Aeronautical Telecommunications. The objective is to ensure that aircraft crossing international boundaries are compatible with the Air Traffic Control systems in all countries that may be visited. Volume III, Part 1 if Annex 10 is concerned with digital data communication systems including the data link functions of Mode S while volume IV defines its operation and signals in space.

The American Radio Technical Commission for Aeronautics (RTCA) and the European Organization for Civil Aviation Equipment (Eurocae) produce minimum operational performance standards for both ground and airborne equipment in accordance with the standards specified in ICAO Annex 10. Both organisations frequently work together and produce common documents.

ARINC (Aeronautical Radio, Incorporated) is an airline run organisation concerned with the form, fit and function of equipment carried in aircraft. Its main purpose is to ensure competition between manufacturers by specifying the size, power requirements, interfaces and performance of equipment to be located in the equipment bay of the aircraft.

== Operation ==
The purpose of SSR is to improve the ability to detect and identify aircraft while automatically providing the Flight Level (pressure altitude) of an aircraft. An SSR ground station transmits interrogation pulses on 1030 MHz (continuously in Modes A, C and selectively, in Mode S) as its antenna rotates, or is electronically scanned, in space. An aircraft transponder within line-of-sight range 'listens' for the SSR interrogation signal and transmits a reply on 1090 MHz that provides aircraft information. The reply sent depends on the interrogation mode. The aircraft is displayed as a tagged icon on the controller's radar screen at the measured bearing and range. An aircraft without an operating transponder still may be observed by primary radar, but would be displayed to the controller without the benefit of SSR derived data. It is typically a requirement to have a working transponder in order to fly in controlled air space and many aircraft have a back-up transponder to ensure that condition is met.

== Interrogation modes ==
There are several modes of interrogation, each indicated by the difference in spacing between two transmitter pulses, known as P1 and P3. Each mode produces a different response from the aircraft. A third pulse, P2, is for side lobe suppression and is described later. Not included are additional military (or IFF) modes, which are described in Identification Friend or Foe.

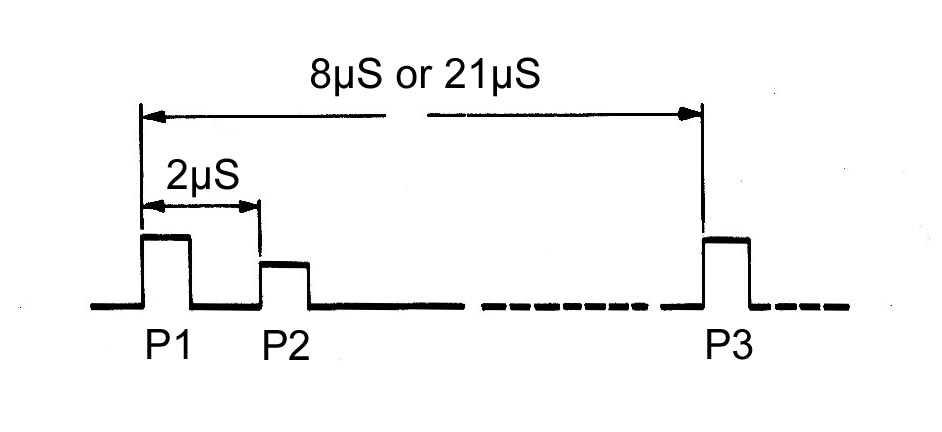
Mode A and C interrogation format

Mode	P1–P3 pulse spacing	Purpose
A	8 μs	Identity
B	17 μs	Identity
C	21 μs	Altitude
D	25 μs	Undefined
S	3.5 μs	Multipurpose

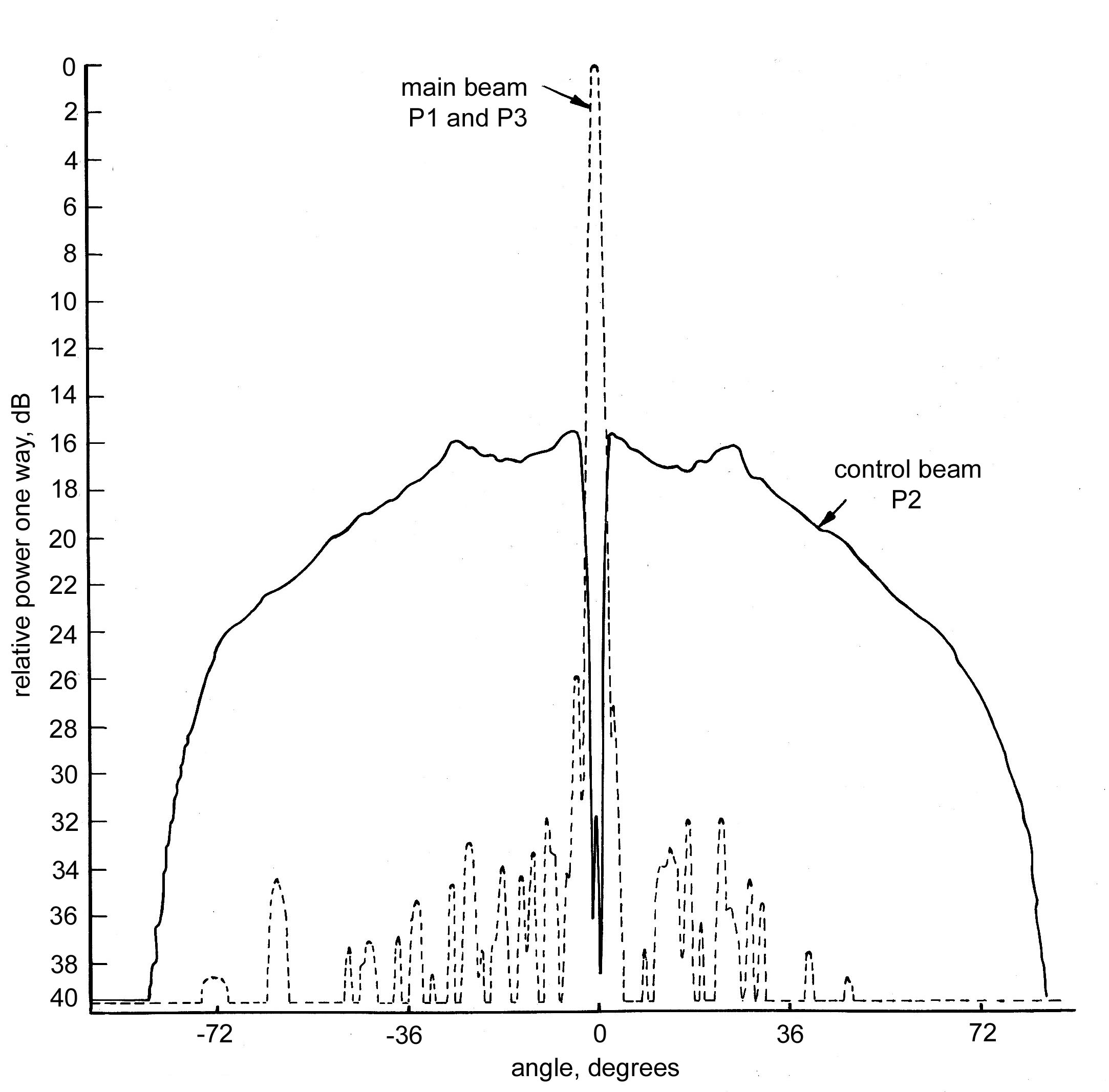
Sum and Control antenna beams

A mode-A interrogation elicits a 12-pulse reply, indicating an identity number associated with that aircraft. The 12 data pulses are bracketed by two framing pulses, F1 and F2. The X pulse is not used. A mode-C interrogation produces an 11-pulse response (pulse D1 is not used), indicating aircraft altitude as indicated by its altimeter in 100-feet increments.

ICAO specified in Doc-8226, the 7th ComDiv meeting report, that primary use of Modes A and Mode B shall be to initiate transponder response for identification and tracking. ^{chp.8, Nr.8.3} The technical parameter for SSR Mode B interrogations were defined by ICAO in Annex 10, but without specifying operational use until deletion from Annex 10.^{Nr. 3.9.3.1.4.1} Mode B was at one time used in Australia.

ICAO specified in Doc-8226, the 7th ComDiv meeting report, that Mode D is reserved for future expansion of the system. ^{chp.8, Nr.8.3} The technical parameter for SSR Mode D were defined by ICAO in Annex 10, but without specifying operational use until Mode D was deleted from Annex 10. ^{Nr. 3.8.4.3} SSR Mode D has therefore never been used operationally .

The new mode, Mode S, has different interrogation characteristics. It comprises pulses P1 and P2 from the antenna main beam to ensure that Mode-A and Mode-C transponders do not reply, followed by a long phase-modulated pulse.

The ground antenna is highly directional but cannot be designed without sidelobes. Aircraft could also detect interrogations coming from these sidelobes and reply appropriately. However these replies can not be differentiated from the intended replies from the main beam and can give rise to a false aircraft indication at an erroneous bearing. To overcome this problem the ground antenna is provided with a second, mainly omni-directional, beam with a gain which exceeds that of the sidelobes but not that of the main beam. A third pulse, P2, is transmitted from this second beam 2 μs after P1. An aircraft detecting P2 stronger than P1 (therefore in the sidelobe and at the incorrect main lobe bearing), does not reply.

== Deficiencies ==
A number of problems are described in an ICAO publication of 1983 entitled Secondary Surveillance Radar Mode S Advisory Circular.

=== Mode A ===
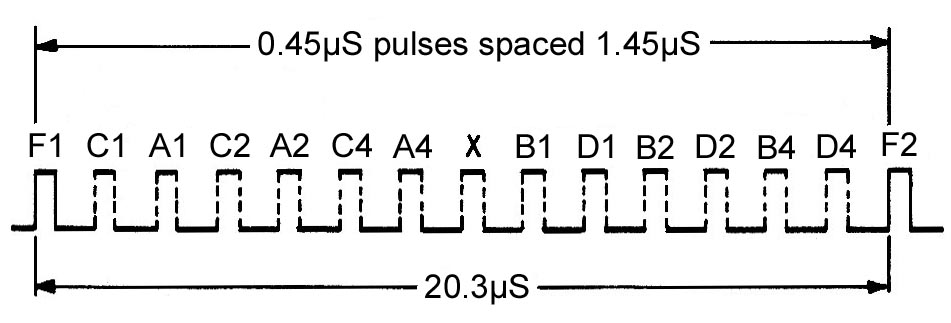
Mode A and C reply format

Although 4,096 different identity codes available in a mode A reply may seem enough, once particular codes have been reserved for emergency and other purposes, the number is significantly reduced. Ideally an aircraft would keep the same code from take-off until landing even when crossing international boundaries, as it is used at the air traffic control centre to display the aircraft's callsign using a process known as code/callsign conversion. Clearly the same mode A code should not be given to two aircraft at the same time as the controller on the ground could be given the wrong callsign with which to communicate with the aircraft.

=== Mode C ===
The mode C reply provides height increments of 100 feet, which was initially adequate for monitoring aircraft separated by at least 1000 feet. However, as airspace became increasingly congested, it became important to monitor whether aircraft were not moving out of their assigned flight level. A slight change of a few feet could cross a threshold and be indicated as the next increment up and a change of 100 feet. Smaller increments were desirable.

=== FRUIT ===
Since all aircraft reply on the same frequency of 1090 MHz, a ground station will also receive aircraft replies originating from responses to other ground stations. These unwanted replies are known as FRUIT (False Replies Unsynchronized with Interrogator Transmissions or alternatively False Replies Unsynchronized In Time). Several successive FRUIT replies could combine and appear to indicate an aircraft which does not exist. As air transport expands and more aircraft occupy the airspace, the amount of FRUIT generated will also increase.

=== Garble ===
FRUIT replies can overlap with wanted replies at a ground receiver, thus causing errors in extracting the included data. A solution is to increase the interrogation rate so as to receive more replies, in the hope that some would be clear of interference. The process is self-defeating as increasing the reply rate only increases the interference to other users and vice versa.

=== Synchronous garble ===
If two aircraft paths cross within about two miles slant range from the ground interrogator, their replies will overlap and the interference caused will make the separation between the overlapping SSR pulse messages difficult, but not technically impossible. Depending on SSR processor, one or both target replies may be lost or when only the framing pulses could be detected neither the Mode A Id nor the Mode C height is provided on the Radar display to the controller, just when the controller may be most interested in monitoring them closely.

=== Capture ===
While an aircraft is replying to one ground interrogation it is unable to respond to another interrogation, reducing detection efficiency. For a Mode A or C interrogation the transponder reply may take up to 120 μs before it can reply to a further interrogation.

=== Antenna ===
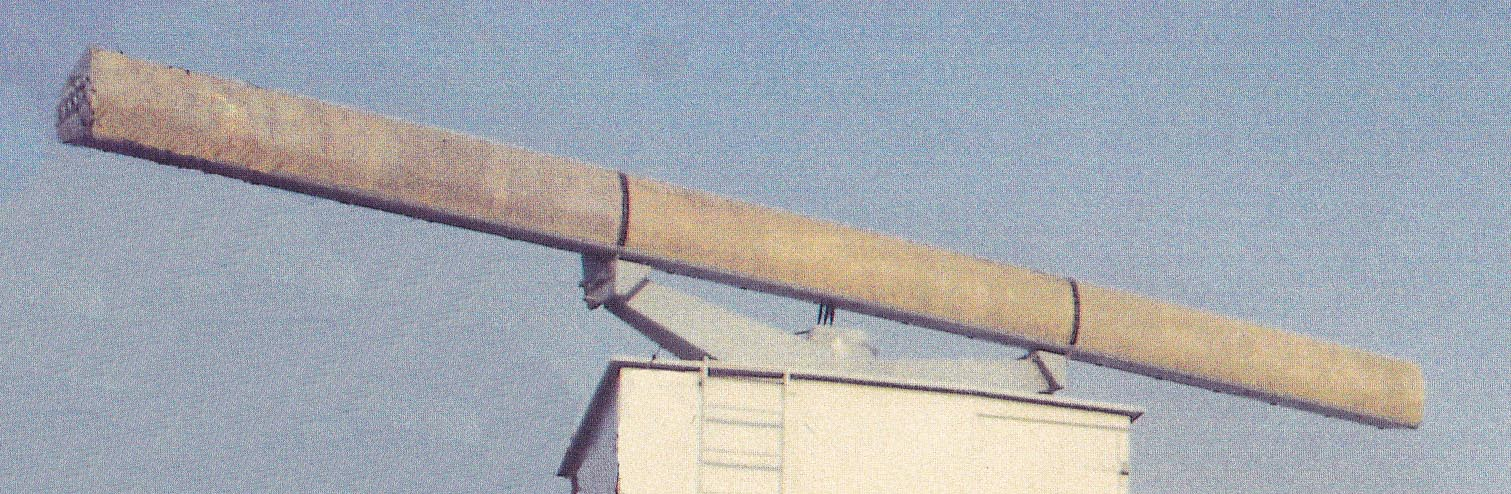
Original SSR antenna providing a narrow horizontal beam and a wide vertical beam

Hogtrough similar to hogtrough antenna

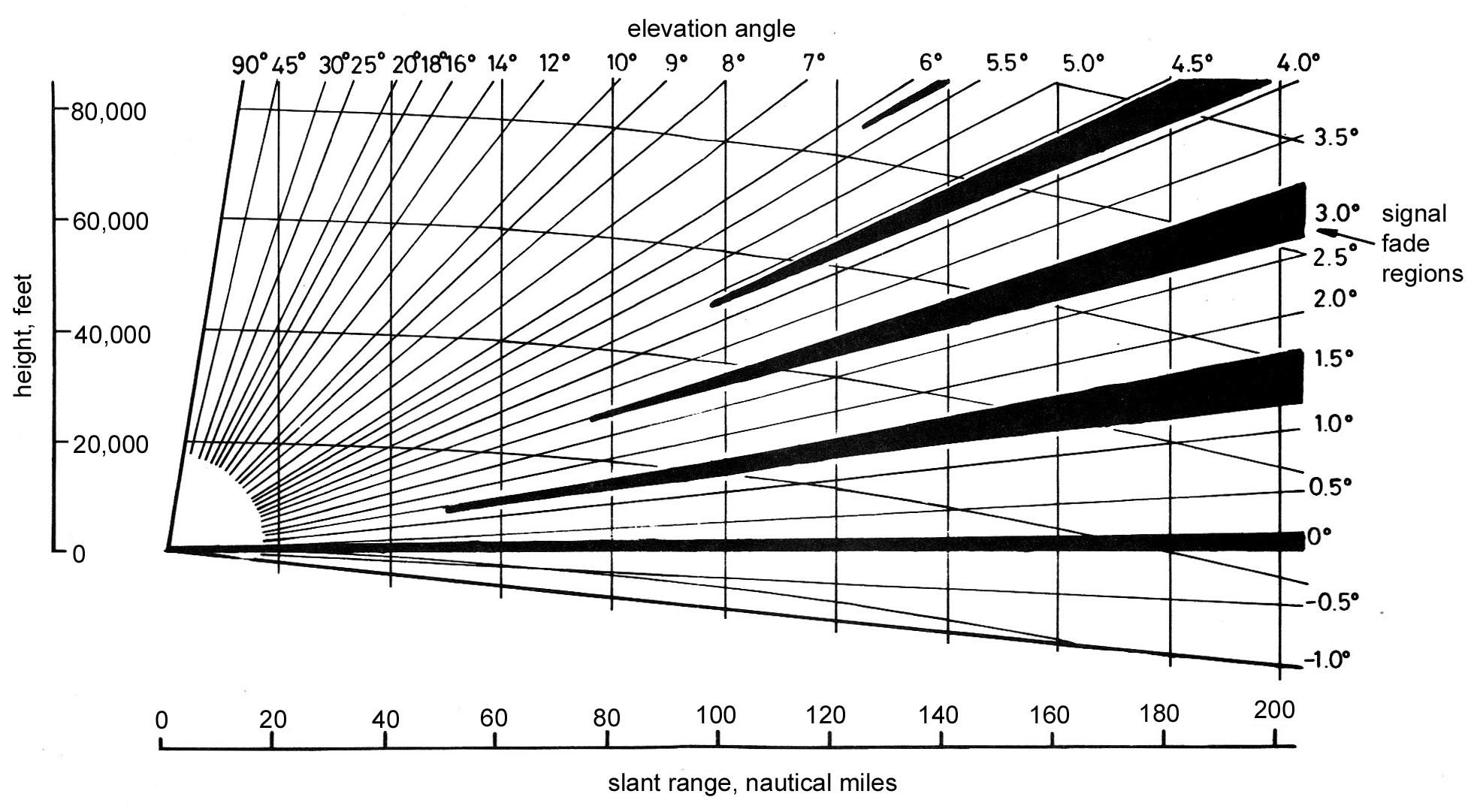
Regions of weak signal due to interference by ground reflection

The first SSR- and IFF-antenna arrays generated up to 6° [@-3 dB points] wide horizontal beams and in reference to the horizontal plane symmetrical and wide vertical beams. This limited the accuracy in determining the bearing of the aircraft, since monopulse capable antenna and interrogator that require only a single valid reply to an interrogation were not yet available.

The first type of detectors were of the so called sliding window type, which determined the bearing by defining the bearing by noting where the first and the last valid reply was received, and taking the center of the replies as the azimuth in reference of the location of the SSR- or IFF-interrogator as the azimuth that the aircraft is flying. Whenever the most replies are not centered around the azimuth beam direction, the target was incorrectly detected and displayed left or right of the beam azimuth.

Depending on the revolutions of the antenna, the max. required detection range, the interrogation repetition frequency (IRF), the azimuth beam width of the antenna, the dwell time when the antenna beam scans over a target position and can elicit a reply, limits the number of replies that may be received from a target even under optimal conditions.

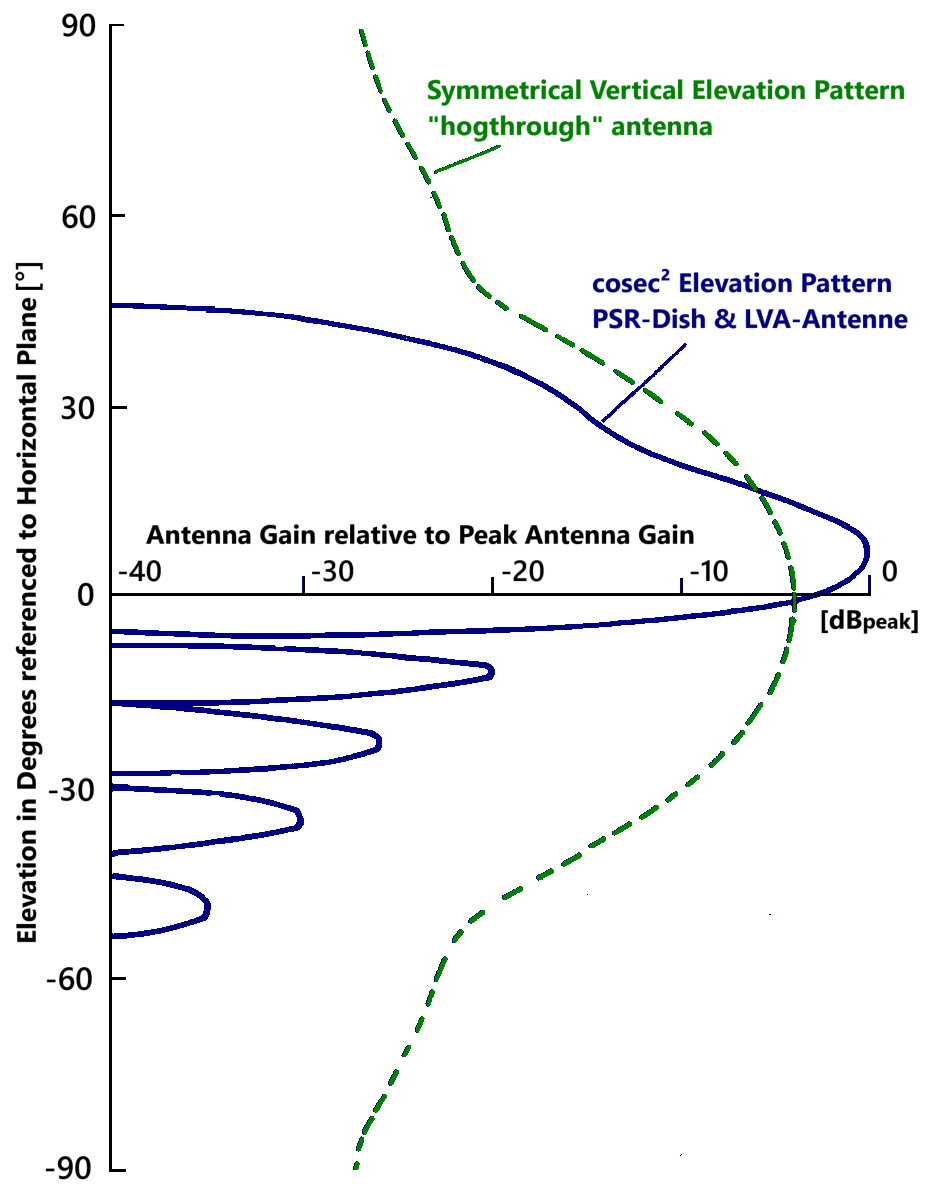
Comparison of symmetrical- vs. cosec2-type SSR- and IFF-antenna elevation-pattern

Any increase of the IRF and/or radiated effective isotropically radiated power (EIRP) is counter productive, because interrogations, increases only theoretically the detection probability. When such an increase in IRF and EIRP is done by most military interrogators, this will increase the replies and the channel-Load on 1090 MHz, but not necessarily the reply efficiency for a given interrogator, since other interrogator are equally likely to trigger a reply by an aircraft transponder, thus increasing the fruit rate, meaning unsolicited replies generated by other SSR- and IFF-interrogators on the 1090 MHz channel. Any increase in EIRP will also increase the range in which transponders are interrogated and thus further increase the channel-load and reduce the probability of a reply and detection by the given interrogator. In heavily congested airspaces with a high number of active SSR- and IFF-interrogator, e.g. ≥ 70 active interrogator were measured in the 1990's by a Flight Inspection aircraft at 10 000ft in the Frankfurt/Germany flight information region. ICAO therefore limited the maximum IRF to ≤450 Hz.

The early system used an antenna known as a hogtrough. The width of the horizontal antenna array and in consequence the antenna gain varied, requiring large arrays with a large number of antenna elements to produce a narrow horizontal beam. The vertical dimensions where identical to the height of the antenna elements used in the array. Since only antenna elements were used that had a symmetrical elevation pattern, e. g. horn-type or LPD antennas, half of the radiated power was transmitted below and above the horizontal plane of the antenna array. Therefore the same type of problems were encountered that previously plagued TACAN that used antenna with a to the horizontal plane symmetrical antenna pattern. The problems were:

1. nearly half the energy is directed at the ground where it is reflected back up, and interferes with, the upward energy causing deep nulls at certain elevation angles and loss of contact with aircraft.
2. if the surrounding ground is sloping, then the reflected energy is partly offset horizontally, distorting the beam shape and the indicated bearing of the aircraft. This was particularly important in a monopulse system with its much improved bearing measurement accuracy.
3. while a vertical tilt of the antenna above the horizontal plane was possible, this had the disadvantage that the detections of targets at lower elevation angles degraded more or less
4. the transmitter has to produce twice the power to a Hogtrough antenna array compared to a PSR parabolic dish or LVA type antenna array with cosec^{2} type elevation patterns that concentrate most of the radiated power above the horizontal plane to achieve the same range, since one half of the power is not radiated toward the target aircraft.

Specification of linear Hogtrough antenna arrays
Array-Type	Antenna gain [dB]	Azimuth beam width (@-3 dB]	Elevation beam width (@-3 dB]	antenna elements	width	height	manufacturer
Hogtrough	^{≥23 dB}	1.9° ±0.2°	35°	Horn antenna	10.5 m	0.5 m	Telefunken
Hogtrough	^{≥21 dB}	2.5° ±0.2°	60°	LPD	9.4 m	0.2 m	Telefunken
Hogtrough	^{≥19 dB}	4.0° ±0.4°	60°	LPD	6.2 m	0.2 m	Telefunken
Hogtrough	^{≥17 dB}	6.0° ±0,6°	60°	LPD	4.2 m	0.2 m	Telefunken

Remark: Telefunken did not specify the reference antenna for the antenna gain, howerever the use of dB instead of dBd or dBi was common practice in that time frame

The U.S. FAA (Federal Aviation Administration) did extensive tests before 1976 to achieve cosec^{2} type vertical antenna pattern by using the existing PSR parabolic dish of PSR-ASR Radar sensors and refitting them with an additional horn type feeder to use the parabolic dish with its cosec^{2}-shaped pattern also for the associated ASR-SSR interrogator. Later tests proved the feasibility to use the parabolic dish for monopulse type interrogators, e.g. for ASR 8 radars from Texas instrument. A parabolic dish was also used with the SSR SRT-4 interrogator in Frankfurt am Main (Germany) for ARS-S and ASR-N radars.

== Developments to address the deficiencies ==
The deficiencies in modes A and C were recognised quite early in the use of SSR and in 1967 Ullyatt published a paper and in 1969 an expanded paper, which proposed improvements to SSR to address the problems. The essence of the proposals was new interrogation and reply formats. Aircraft identity and altitude were to be included in the one reply so collation of the two data items would not be needed. To protect against errors a simple parity system was proposed – see Secondary Surveillance Radar – Today and Tomorrow. Monopulse would be used to determine the bearing of the aircraft thereby reducing to one the number of interrogations/replies per aircraft on each scan of the antenna. Further each interrogation would be preceded by main beam pulses P1 and P2 separated by 2 μs so that transponders operating on modes A and C would take it as coming from the antenna sidelobe and not reply and not cause unnecessary FRUIT.

The U.S. FAA was considering similar problems but assumed that a new pair of frequencies would be required. Ullyatt showed that the existing 1030 MHz and 1090 MHz frequencies could be retained and the existing ground interrogators and airborne transponders, with suitable modifications, could be used. The result was a Memorandum of Understanding between the U.S. and the UK to develop a common system. In the U.S. the programme was called DABS (Discrete Address Beacon System), and in the UK Adsel (Address selective).

Monopulse, which means single pulse, had been used in military track-and-follow systems whereby the antenna was steered to follow a particular target by keeping the target in the centre of the beam. Ullyatt proposed the use of a continuously rotating beam with bearing measurement made wherever the pulse may arrive in the beam.

The FAA engaged MIT Lincoln Laboratory to further develop the system and it produced a series of ATC Reports defining all aspects of the new joint development. Added to Ullyatt's concept was the use of a more powerful 24-bit parity system using a cyclic redundancy code, which not only ensured the accuracy of the received data without the need for repetition but also allowed errors caused by an overlapping FRUIT reply to be corrected. A proposed aircraft identity code comprised 24 bits with 16 million permutations. This allowed each aircraft to be assigned its own unique address. Blocks of addresses are allocated to different countries and further allocated to particular airlines so that the address could readily identify them also. The Lincoln Laboratory report ATC 42 entitled Mode S Beacon System: Functional Description gave details on the proposed new system.

The two countries reported the results of their development in a joint paper, ADSEL/DABS – A Selective Address Secondary Surveillance Radar. This was followed at a conference at ICAO Headquarters in Montreal, at which a low-power interrogation test by Lincoln Laboratory successfully communicated with an upgraded commercial SSR transponder of UK manufacture.

The only thing needed was an international name. Much had been made of the proposed new features but the existing ground SSR interrogators would still be used, albeit with modification, and the existing aircraft transponders, again with modification. The best way of showing that this was an evolution not a revolution was to still call it SSR but with a new mode letter. Mode S was the obvious choice, with the S standing for select. In 1983 ICAO issued an advisory circular describing the new system.

=== Improved antenna ===
The problem with the existing standard "hogtrough" antenna was caused by the energy radiated toward the ground, which was reflected up and interfered with the upwards directed energy. The answer was to shape the vertical beam.

FAA did extensive tests before 1976 to achieve cosec^{2}-type vertical antenna pattern by using the existing PSR parabolic dish of PSR-ASR Radar sensors and refitting them with additional horn type feeder to use the parabolic dish with its cosec^{2}- shaped pattern also for the associated ASR-SSR interrogator. Later tests proved provided the feasibility to use the parabolic dish for monopulse type interrogators, e.g. ASR 8 from Texas instrument was used with the SSR SRT-4 interrogator in Frankfurt am Main ARS-S and ASR-N.

A later approach to allow also standalone SSR interrogator were the so called Large Vertical Arrays (LVA) that replaced each antenna element with a vertical antenna array that provided a cosec^{2}-shaped vertical antenna pattern, similar to those cosec^{2} shaped vertical antenna pattern already used in vertical DME/N and TACAN antenna arrays. A five-foot vertical dimension was found to be optimum, and it has become the international standard.

== Monopulse secondary surveillance radar ==
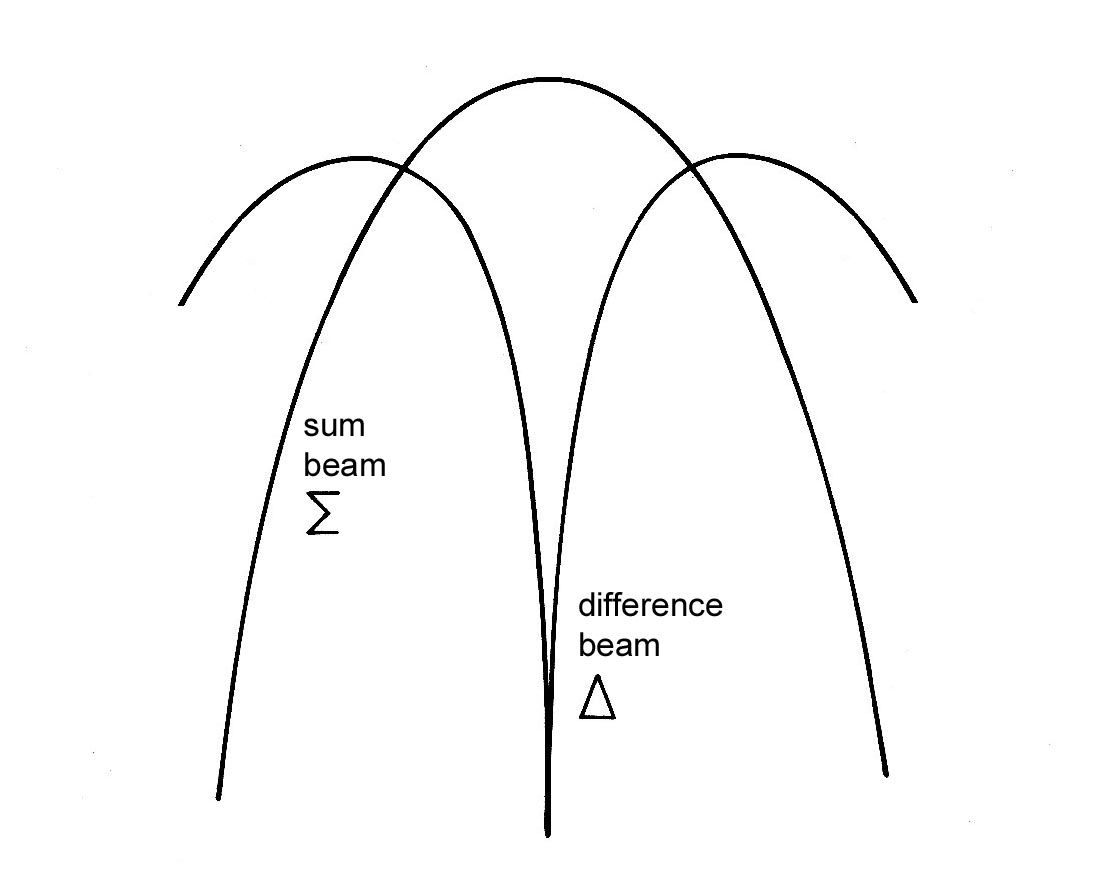
Antenna main beam with difference beam

The Mode S system was intended to operate with just a single reply from an aircraft, a system known as monopulse. The accompanying diagram shows a conventional main or "sum" beam of an SSR antenna to which has been added a "difference" beam. To produce the sum beam the signal is distributed horizontally across the antenna aperture. This feed system is divided into two equal halves and the two parts summed again to produce the original sum beam. However the two halves are also subtracted to produce a difference output. A signal arriving exactly normal, or boresight, to the antenna will produce a maximum output in the sum beam but a zero signal in the difference beam. Away from boresight the signal in the sum beam will be less but there will be a non-zero signal in the difference beam. The angle of arrival of the signal can be determined by measuring the ratio of the signals between the sum and difference beams. The ambiguity about boresight can be resolved as there is a 180° phase change in the difference signal either side of boresight. Bearing measurements can be made on a single pulse, hence monopulse, but accuracy can be improved by averaging measurements made on several or all of the pulses received in a reply from an aircraft. A monopulse receiver was developed early in the UK Adsel programme and this design is still used widely. Mode S reply pulses are deliberately designed to be similar to mode A and C replies so the same receiver can be used to provide improved bearing measurement for the SSR mode A and C system with the advantage that the interrogation rate can be substantially reduced thereby reducing the interference caused to other users of the system.

Lincoln Laboratory exploited the availability of a separate bearing measurement on each reply pulse to overcome some of the problems of garble whereby two replies overlap making associating the pulses with the two replies. Since each pulse is separately labelled with direction this information can be used to unscramble two overlapping mode A or C replies. The process is presented in ATC-65 "The ATCRBS Mode of DABS". The approach can be taken further by also measuring the strength of each reply pulse and using that as a discriminate as well. The following table compares the performance of conventional SSR, monopulse SSR (MSSR) and Mode S.

	Standard SSR	Monopulse SSR	Mode S
Replies per scan	20–30	4–8	1
Range accuracy	230 m rms	13 m rms	7 m rms
Bearing accuracy	0.08° rms	0.04° rms	0.04° rms
Height resolution	100 ft (30 m)	100 ft	25 ft (7.6 m)
Garble resistance	Poor	Good	Best
Data capacity (uplink)	0	0	56 – 1,280 bits
Data capacity (downlink)	23 bits	23 bits	56 – 1,280 bits
Identity permutations	4,096	4,096	16 million

The MSSR replaced most of the existing SSRs by the 1990s and its accuracy provided for a reduction of separation minima in en-route ATC from 10 nautical miles (19 km; 12 mi) to 5 nautical miles (9.3 km; 5.8 mi)

MSSR resolved many of the system problems of SSR, as changes to the ground system only, were required. The existing transponders installed in aircraft were unaffected. It undoubtedly resulted in the delay of Mode S.

== Mode S ==
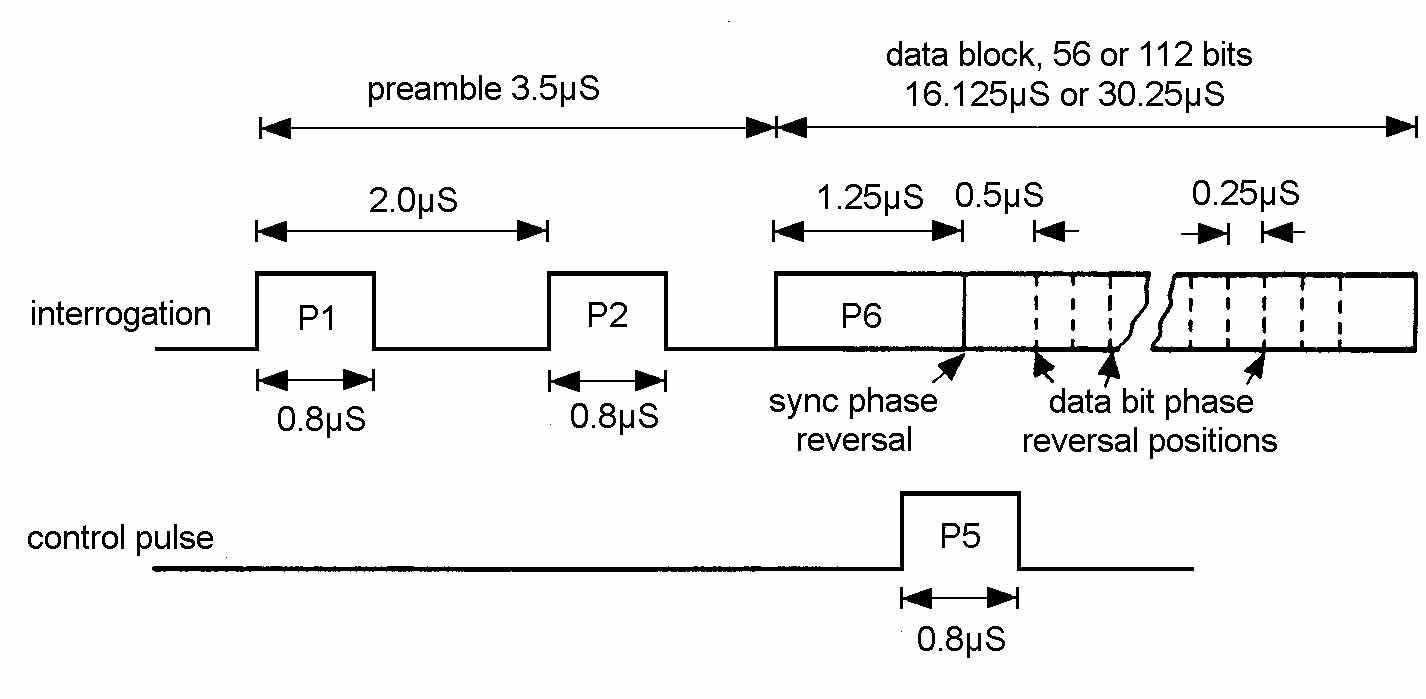
Mode S interrogation, short and long

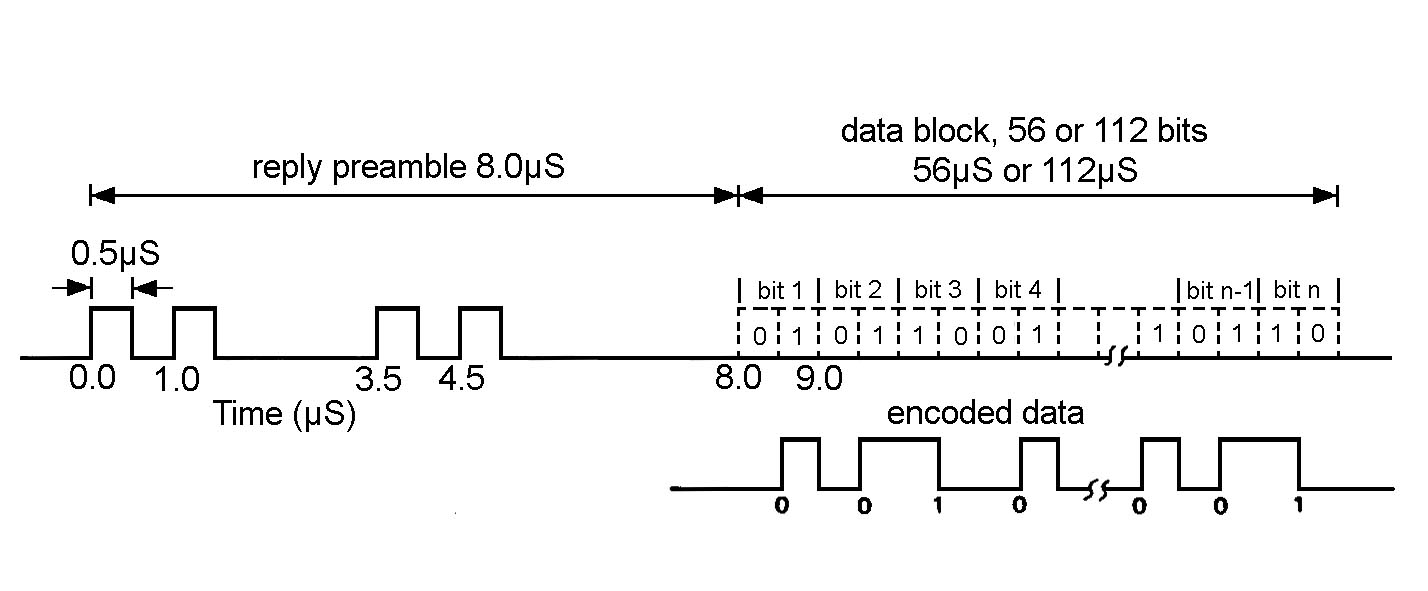
Mode S reply, short and long

A more detailed description of Mode S is given in the Eurocontrol publication Principles of Mode S and Interrogator Codes and the ICAO circular 174-AN/110 Secondary Surveillance Radar Mode S Advisory Circular. The 16 million permutations of the 24-bit aircraft address codes have been allocated in blocks to individual states and the assignment is given in ICAO Annex 10, Volume III, Chapter 9.

A mode S interrogation comprises two 0.8 μs wide pulses, which are interpreted by a mode A & C transponder as coming from an antenna sidelobe and therefore a reply is not required. The following long P6 pulse is phase modulated with the first phase reversal, after 1.25 μs, synchronising the transponder's phase detector. Subsequent phase reversals indicate a data bit of 1, with no phase reversal indicating a bit of value 0. This form of modulation provides some resistance to corruption by a chance overlapping pulse from another ground interrogator. The interrogation may be short with P6 = 16.125 μs, mainly used to obtain a position update, or long, P6 = 30.25 μs, if an additional 56 data bits are included. The final 24 bits contain both the parity and address of the aircraft. On receiving an interrogation, an aircraft will decode the data and calculate the parity. If the remainder is not the address of the aircraft then either the interrogation was not intended for it or it was corrupted. In either case it will not reply. If the ground station was expecting a reply and did not receive one then it will re-interrogate.

The aircraft reply consists of a preamble of four pulses spaced so that they cannot be erroneously formed from overlapping mode A or C replies. The remaining pulses contain data using pulse position amplitude modulation. Each 1 μs interval is divided into two parts. If a 0.5 μs pulse occupies the first half and there is no pulse in the second half then a binary 1 is indicated. If it is the other way round then it represents a binary 0. In effect the data is transmitted twice, the second time in inverted form. This format is very resistant to error due to a garbling reply from another aircraft. To cause a hard error one pulse has to be cancelled and a second pulse inserted in the other half of the bit period. Much more likely is that both halves are confused and the decoded bit is flagged as "low confidence".

The reply also has parity and address in the final 24 bits. The ground station tracks the aircraft and uses the predicted position to indicate the range and bearing of the aircraft so it can interrogate again and get an update of its position. If it is expecting a reply and if it receives one then it checks the remainder from the parity check against the address of the expected aircraft. If it is not the same then either it is the wrong aircraft and a re-interrogation is necessary, or the reply has been corrupted by interference by being garbled by another reply. The parity system has the power to correct errors as long as they do not exceed 24 μs, which embraces the duration of a mode A or C reply, the most expected source of interference in the early days of Mode S. The pulses in the reply have individual monopulse angle measurements available, and in some implementations also signal strength measurements, which can indicate bits that are inconsistent with the majority of the other bits, thereby indicating possible corruption. A test is made by inverting the state of some or all of these bits (a 0 changed to a 1 or vice versa) and if the parity check now succeeds the changes are made permanent and the reply accepted. If it fails then a re-interrogation is required.

Mode S operates on the principle that interrogations are directed to a specific aircraft using that aircraft's unique address. This results in a single reply with aircraft range determined by the time taken to receive the reply and monopulse providing an accurate bearing measurement. In order to interrogate an aircraft its address must be known. To meet this requirement the ground interrogator also broadcasts All-Call interrogations, which are in two forms.

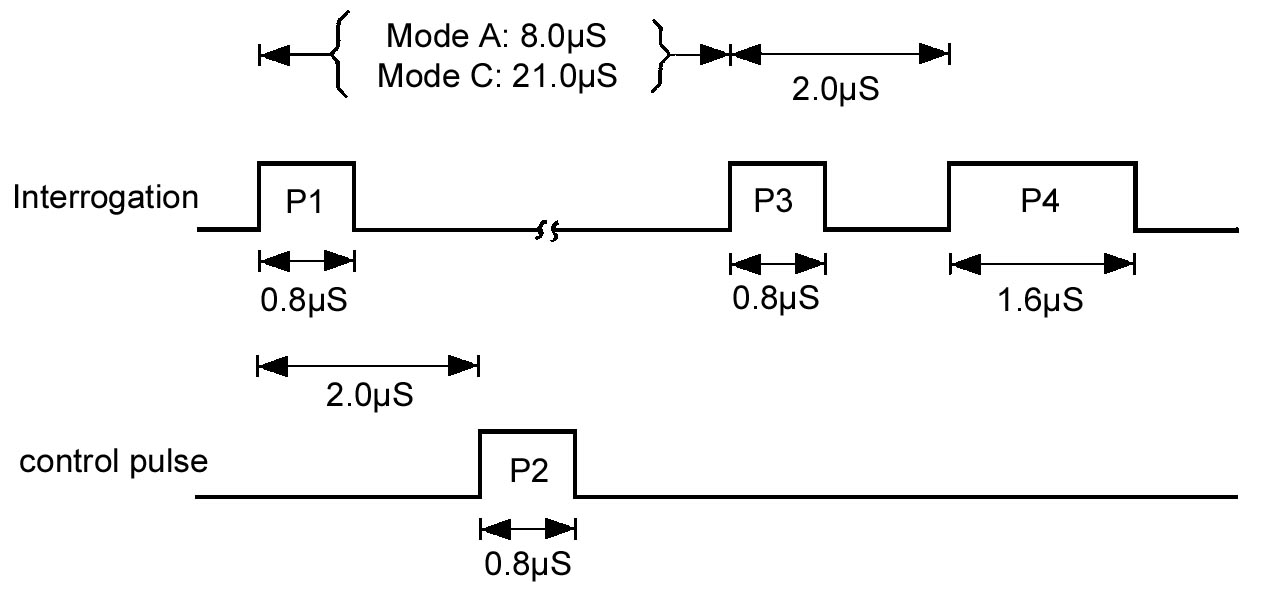
Mode A/C/S All-Call interrogation

In one form, the Mode A/C/S All-Call looks like a conventional Mode A or C interrogation at first and a transponder will start the reply process on receipt of pulse P3. However a Mode S transponder will abort this procedure upon the detection of pulse P4, and instead respond with a short Mode S reply containing its 24 bit address. This form of All-Call interrogation is now not much used as it will continue to obtain replies from aircraft already known and give rise to unnecessary interference. The alternative form of All-Call uses short Mode S interrogation with a 16.125 μs data block. This can include an indication of the interrogator transmitting the All-Call with the request that if the aircraft has already replied to this interrogator then do not reply again as aircraft is already known and a reply unnecessary.

The Mode S interrogation can take three forms:

Name	Form	Use
Surveillance	Short	Position update
Comm-A	Long	Contains 56 data bits
Comm-C	Long	Up to 16 long interrogations strung together to transmit up to 1280 bits

The first five bits, known as the uplink field (UF) in the data block indicate the type of interrogation. The final 24 bits in each case is combined aircraft address and parity. Not all permutations have yet been allocated but those that have are shown:

Uplink field (UF)		Application
Binary	Decimal	Application
00000	0	Short air-air surveillance (TCAS)
00100	4	Surveillance, altitude request
00101	5	Surveillance, Mode A identity request
01011	11	Mode S only All-Call
10000	16	Long air-air surveillance (TCAS)
10100	20	Comm-A including altitude request
10101	21	Comm-A including Mode A identity request
11000	24	Comm-C (extended length message)

Similarly the Mode S reply can take three forms:

Name	Form	Use
Surveillance	Short	Position update
Comm-B	Long	Contains 56 data bits
Comm-D	Long	Up to 16 long interrogations strung together to transmit up to 1280 bits

The first five bits, known as the downlink field (DF) in the data block indicate the type of reply. The final 24 bits in each case is combined aircraft address and parity. Eleven permutations have been allocated.

Downlink field (DF)		Application
Binary	Decimal	Application
00000	0	Short air-air surveillance (TCAS)
00100	4	Surveillance, altitude reply
00101	5	Surveillance, Mode A identity reply
01011	11	All-Call reply containing aircraft address
10000	16	Long air-air surveillance (TCAS)
10001	17	Extended squitter
10010	18	TIS-B
10011	19	Military extended squitter
10100	20	Comm-B reply including altitude
10101	21	Comm-B reply including Mode A identity
10110	22	Military use
11000	24	Up to 16 long replies strung together to transmit up to 1280 bits

A transponder equipped to transmit Comm-B replies is fitted with 256 data registers each of 56 bits. The contents of these registers are filled and maintained from on-board data sources. If the ground system requires this data then it requests it by a Surveillance or Comm-A interrogation.

ICAO Annex 10, Volume III, Chapter 5 lists the contents of all those currently allocated. A reduced number are required for current operational use. Other registers are intended for use with TCAS and ADS-B. The Comm-B Data Selector (BDS) numbers are in hexadecimal notation.

Register	Data
BDS 6,0	Magnetic heading
BDS 6,0	Indicated airspeed
BDS 6,0	Mach number
BDS 6,0	Vertical rate
BDS 5,0	Roll angle
BDS 5,0	Track angle rate
BDS 5,0	True track angle
BDS 5,0	Ground speed
BDS 4,0	Selected vertical intent

== Extended squitter ==
Starting in 2009, the ICAO defined an "extended squitter" mode of operation; it supplements the requirements contained in ICAO Annex 10, Volumes III and IV. The first edition specified earlier versions of extended squitter messages:

Version 0
Extends Mode S to deal with basic ADS-B exchanges, to add traffic information broadcast (TIS-B) format information, as well as uplink and downlink broadcast protocol information.

Version 1
Better describes surveillance accuracy and integrity information (navigation accuracy category, navigation integrity category, surveillance integrity level), and additional parameters for TIS-B and ADS-B rebroadcast (ADS-R).

Version 2
The second edition introduced yet a new version of extended squitter formats and protocols to:
- enhance integrity and accuracy reporting
- add a number of additional parameters to support identified operational needs for the use of ADS-B not covered by Version 1 (including capabilities to support airport surface applications)
- modify several parameters, and remove a number of parameters, which are no longer required to support ADS-B applications

== See also ==
- Air traffic control radar beacon system, all encompassing description
- Automatic dependent surveillance-broadcast, free flight enhancement
- Traffic collision avoidance system
- Transponder (aeronautics)
- Transponder landing system
- Gillham code
