= Gillham code =

Binary code

- Digits: 12
- Tracks: 9..11
- Continuity: no
- Cyclic: yes
- Minimum distance: 1
- Maximum distance: 1
- Lexicography: no

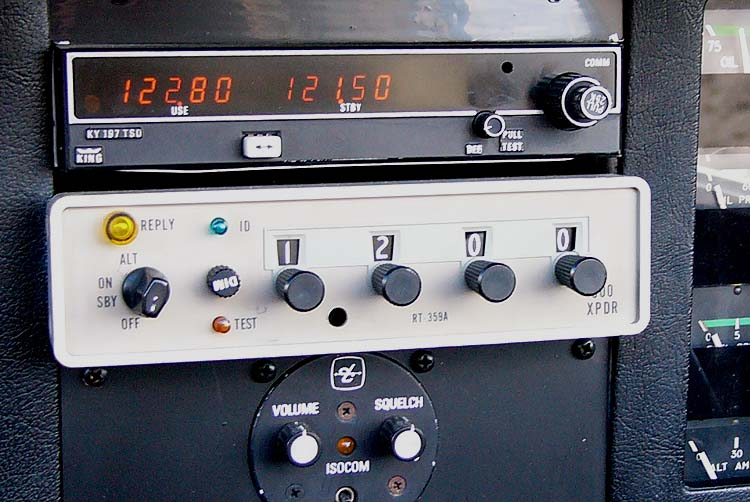
A Cessna ARC RT-359A transponder (the beige box) in the instrument panel of an American Aviation AA-1 Yankee light aircraft. The transponder gets its altitude information from an encoding altimeter mounted behind the instrument panel that communicates via the Gillham code.

Gillham code is a zero-padded 12-bit binary code using a parallel nine- to eleven-wire interface, the Gillham interface, that is used to transmit uncorrected barometric altitude between an encoding altimeter or analog air data computer and a digital transponder. It is a modified form of a Gray code and is sometimes referred to simply as a "Gray code" in avionics literature.

== History ==
The Gillham interface and code are an outgrowth of the 12-bit IFF Mark X system, which was introduced in the 1950s. The civil transponder interrogation modes A and C were defined in air traffic control (ATC) and secondary surveillance radar (SSR) in 1960.

The code is named after Ronald Lionel Gillham, a signals officer at Air Navigational Services, Ministry of Transport and Civil Aviation, who had been appointed a civil member of the Most Excellent Order of the British Empire (MBE) in the Queen's 1955 Birthday Honours. He was the UK's representative to the International Air Transport Association (IATA) committee developing the specification for the second generation of air traffic control system, known in the UK as "Plan Ahead", and is said to have had the idea of using a modified Gray code. (Note: Anecdotally, Ronald Lionel Gillham had the idea for the modified Gray code while having a family dinner. Reportedly, he died in March 1968.) The final code variant was developed in late 1961 for the ICAO Communications Division meeting (VII COM) held in January/February 1962, and described in a 1962 FAA report. The exact timeframe and circumstances of the term Gillham code being coined are unclear, but by 1963 the code was already recognized under this name. By the mid-1960s the code was also known as MOA–Gillham code or ICAO–Gillham code. ARINC 572 specified the code as well in 1968.

Once recommended by the ICAO for automatic height transmission for air traffic control purposes, the interface is now discouraged and has been mostly replaced by modern serial communication in newer aircraft.

== Altitude encoder ==
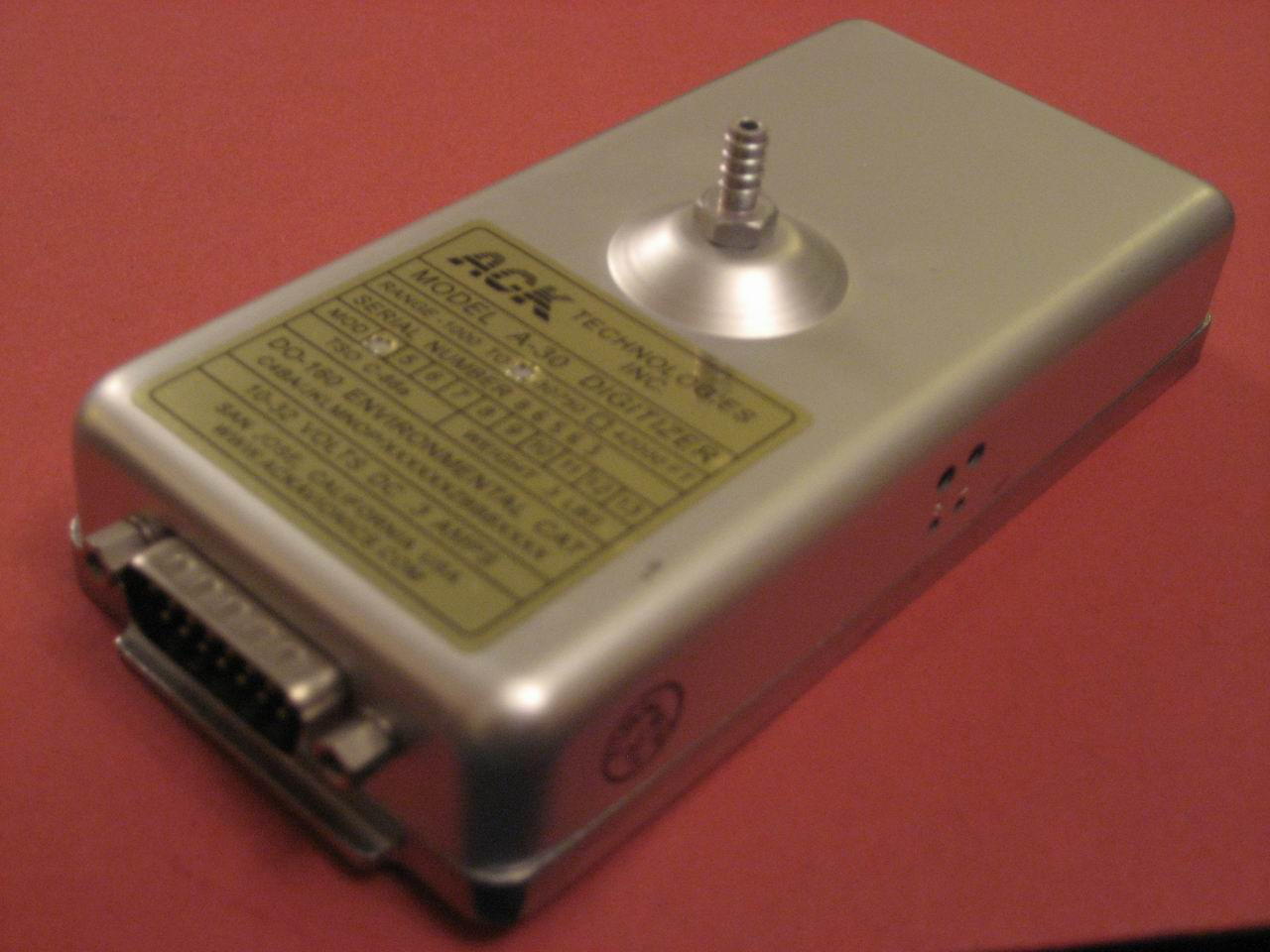
A typical altitude encoder, the ACK Technologies A-30. Note the 15-way D-type connector to send the Gillham code to the transponder and the port on the top of the case that connects to the aircraft's static pressure system.

An altitude encoder takes the form of a small metal box containing a pressure sensor and signal conditioning electronics. The pressure sensor is often heated, which requires a warm-up time during which height information is either unavailable or inaccurate. Older style units can have a warm-up time of up to 10 minutes; more modern units warm up in less than 2 minutes. Some of the very latest encoders incorporate unheated 'instant on' type sensors. During the warm-up of older style units the height information may gradually increase until it settles at its final value. This is not normally a problem as the power would typically be applied before the aircraft enters the runway and so it would be transmitting correct height information soon after take-off.

The encoder has an open-collector output, compatible with 14 V or 28 V electrical systems.

== Coding ==
The height information is represented as 11 binary digits in a parallel form using 11 separate lines designated D2–D4–A1–A2–A4–B1–B2–B4–C1–C2–C4. As a twelfth bit, the Gillham code contains a D1 bit but this is unused and always set to 0.

Different classes of altitude encoder do not use all of the available bits. All use the A, B and C bits; increasing altitude limits require more of the D bits. Up to and including 30,700 ft (9,400 m) does not require any of the D bits (9-wire interface). This is suitable for most light general aviation aircraft. Up to and including 62,700 ft (19.1 km) requires D4 (10-wire interface). Up to and including 126,700 ft (38.6 km) requires D4 and D2 (11-wire interface). D1 is never used.

Gillham binary code [D1,2,4–A1,2,4–B1,2,4–C1,2,4]	Squawk octal [ABCD]	Height [m]	Height [ft]
000 000 000 001	0040	−365.76	−1200
000 000 000 011	0060	−335.28	−1100
000 000 000 010	0020	−304.8	−1000
000 000 000 110	0030	−274.32	−900
000 000 000 100	0010	−243.84	−800
000 000 001 100	0410	−213.36	−700
000 000 001 110	0430	−182.88	−600
000 000 001 010	0420	−152.4	−500
000 000 001 011	0460	−121.92	−400
000 000 001 001	0440	−91.44	−300
000 000 011 001	0640	−60.96	−200
000 000 011 011	0660	−30.48	−100
000 000 011 010	0620	0	0
000 000 011 110	0630	30.48	100
000 000 011 100	0610	60.96	200
000 000 010 100	0210	91.44	300
000 000 010 110	0230	121.92	400
000 000 010 010	0220	152.4	500
000 000 010 011	0260	182.88	600
000 000 010 001	0240	213.36	700
000 000 110 001	0340	243.84	800
000 000 110 011	0360	274.32	900
000 000 110 010	0320	304.8	1000
000 000 110 110	0330	335.28	1100
000 000 110 100	0310	365.76	1200
000 000 111 100	0710		1300
000 000 111 110	0730		1400
000 000 111 010	0720		1500
000 000 111 011	0760		1600
000 000 111 001	0740		1700
000 000 101 001	0540		1800
000 000 101 011	0560		1900
000 000 101 010	0520		2000
000 000 101 110	0530		2100
000 000 101 100	0510		2200
000 000 100 100	0110		2300
000 000 100 110	0130		2400
000 000 100 010	0120		2500
000 000 100 011	0160		2600
000 000 100 001	0140		2700
…	…	…	…
010 000 000 110	0032		126400
010 000 000 010	0022		126500
010 000 000 011	0062		126600
010 000 000 001	0042		126700

== Decoding ==
Bits D2 (msbit) through B4 (lsbit) encode the pressure altitude in 500 ft increments (above a base altitude of −1000±250 ft) in a standard 8-bit reflected binary code (Gray code). The specification stops at code 1000000 (126500±250 ft), above which D1 would be needed as a most significant bit.

Bits C1, C2 and C4 use a mirrored 5-state 3-bit Gray BCD code of a Giannini Datex code type (with the first 5 states resembling O'Brien code type II) to encode the offset from the 500 ft altitude in 100 ft increments. Specifically, if the parity of the 500 ft code is even then codes 001, 011, 010, 110 and 100 encode −200, −100, 0, +100 and +200 ft relative to the 500 ft altitude. If the parity is odd, the assignments are reversed. Codes 000, 101 and 111 are not used.

The Gillham code can be decoded using various methods. Standard techniques use hardware or software solutions. The latter often uses a lookup table but an algorithmic approach can be taken.

== See also ==
- Air traffic control radar beacon system (ATCRBS)
- Selective Identification Feature (SIF)
- IFF code
- Flight level
- ARINC 429
