= Air traffic control radar beacon system =

Part of air traffic control

The air traffic control radar beacon system (ATCRBS) is a system used in air traffic control (ATC) to enhance surveillance radar monitoring and separation of air traffic. It consists of a rotating ground antenna and transponders in aircraft. The ground antenna sweeps a narrow vertical beam of microwaves around the airspace. When the beam strikes an aircraft, the transponder transmits a return signal back giving information such as altitude and the Squawk Code, a four digit code assigned to each aircraft that enters a region. Information about this aircraft is then entered into the system and subsequently added to the controller's screen to display this information when queried. This information can include flight number designation and altitude of the aircraft. ATCRBS assists air traffic control (ATC) surveillance radars by acquiring information about the aircraft being monitored, and providing this information to the radar controllers. The controllers can use the information to identify radar returns from aircraft (known as targets) and to distinguish those returns from ground clutter.

== Parts of the system ==
The system consists of transponders, installed in aircraft, and secondary surveillance radars (SSRs), installed at air traffic control facilities. The SSR is sometimes co-located with the primary surveillance radar, or PSR. These two radar systems work in conjunction to produce a synchronized surveillance picture. The SSR transmits interrogations and listens for any replies. Transponders that receive an interrogation decode it, decide whether to reply, and then respond with the requested information when appropriate. Note that in common informal usage, the term "SSR" is sometimes used to refer to the entire ATCRBS system, however this term (as found in technical publications) properly refers only to the ground radar itself.

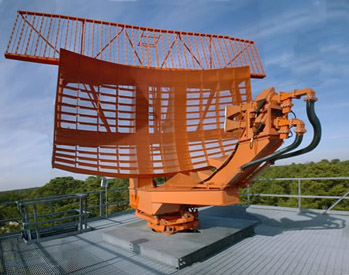
The antenna system of a typical air traffic control radar, the ASR-9. The curved reflector antenna on the bottom is the primary surveillance radar (PSR), and the flat antenna on top of it is the secondary surveillance radar (SSR). In operation the antenna rotates about a vertical axis, sweeping a vertical fan-shaped beam of microwaves around the local airspace to locate and track aircraft.

=== Ground Interrogation Equipment ===
An ATC ground station consists of two radar systems and their associated support components. The most prominent component is the PSR. It is also referred to as skin paint radar because it shows not synthetic or alpha-numeric target symbols, but bright (or colored) blips or areas on the radar screen produced by the RF energy reflections from the target's "skin." This is a non-cooperative process, no additional avionic devices are needed. The radar detects and displays reflective objects within the radar's operating range. Weather radar data is displayed in skin paint mode. The primary surveillance radar is subject to the radar equation that says signal strength drops off as the fourth power of distance to the target. Objects detected using the PSR are known as primary targets.

The second system is the secondary surveillance radar, or SSR, which depends on a cooperating transponder installed on the aircraft being tracked. The transponder emits a signal when it is interrogated by the secondary radar. In a transponder based system signals drop off as the inverse square of the distance to the target, instead of the fourth power in primary radars. As a result, effective range is greatly increased for a given power level. The transponder can also send encoded information about the aircraft, such as identity and altitude.

The SSR is equipped with a main antenna, and an omnidirectional "Omni" antenna at many older sites. Newer antennas (as in the adjacent picture), are grouped as a left and right antenna, and each side connects to a hybrid device which combines the signals into sum and difference channels. Still other sites have both the sum and difference antenna, and an Omni antenna. Surveillance aircraft, e.g. AWACS, have only the sum and difference antennas, but can also be space stabilized by phase shifting the beam down or up when pitched or rolled. The SSR antenna is typically fitted to the PSR antenna, so they point in the same direction as the antennas rotate. The omnidirectional antenna is mounted near and high, usually on top of the radome if equipped. Mode-S interrogators require the sum and difference channels to provide the monopulse capability to measure the off-boresight angle of the transponder reply.

The SSR repetitively transmits interrogations as the rotating radar antenna scans the sky. The interrogation specifies what type of information a replying transponder should send by using a system of modes. There have been a number of modes used historically, but four are in common use today: mode 1, mode 2, mode 3/A, and mode C. Mode 1 is used to sort military targets during phases of a mission. Mode 2 is used to identify military aircraft missions. Mode 3/A is used to identify each aircraft in the radar's coverage area. Mode C is used to request/report an aircraft's altitude.

Two other modes, mode 4 and mode S, are not considered part of the ATCRBS system, but they use the same transmit and receive hardware. Mode 4 is used by military aircraft for the Identification Friend or Foe (IFF) system. Mode S is a discrete selective interrogation, rather than a general broadcast, that facilitates TCAS for civilian aircraft. Mode S transponders ignore interrogations not addressed with their unique identity code, reducing channel congestion. At a typical SSR radar installation, ATCRBS, IFF, and mode S interrogations will all be transmitted in an interlaced fashion. Some military facilities and/or aircraft will also utilize Mode S.

Returns from both radars at the ground station are transmitted to the ATC facility using a microwave link, a coaxial link, or (with newer radars) a digitizer and a modem. Once received at the ATC facility, a computer system known as a radar data processor associates the reply information with the proper primary target and displays it next to the target on the radar scope.

=== Airborne Transponder Equipment ===
The equipment installed in the aircraft is considerably simpler, consisting of the transponder itself, usually mounted in the instrument panel or avionics rack, and a small L band UHF antenna, mounted on the bottom of the fuselage. Many commercial aircraft also have an antenna on the top of the fuselage, and either or both antennas can be selected by the flight crew.

Typical installations also include an altitude encoder, which is a small device connected to both the transponder and the aircraft's static system. It provides the aircraft's pressure altitude to the transponder, so that it may relay the information to the ATC facility. The encoder uses 11 wires to pass altitude information to the transponder in the form of a Gillham Code, a modified binary Gray code.

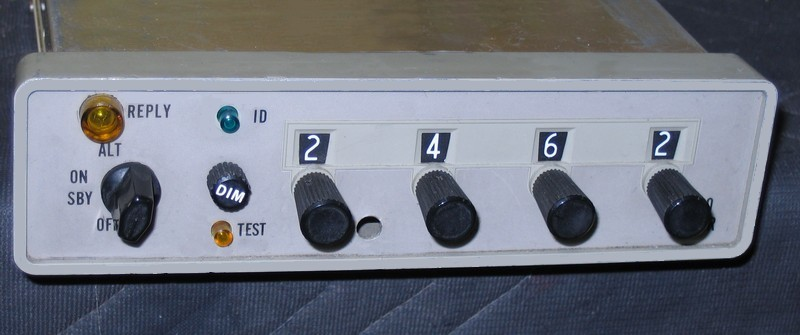
A light aircraft transponder

The transponder has a small required set of controls and is simple to operate. It has a method to enter the four-digit transponder code, also known as a beacon code or squawk code, and a control to transmit an ident, which is done at the controller's request (see SPI pulse below). Transponders typically have 4 operating modes: Off, Standby, On (Mode-A), and Alt (Mode-C). On and Alt mode differ only in that the On mode inhibits transmitting any altitude information. Standby mode allows the unit to remain powered and warmed up but inhibits any replies, since the radar is used for searching the aircraft and exact location of aircraft.

== Theory of operation ==
The steps involved in performing an ATCRBS interrogation are as follows: First, the ATCRBS interrogator periodically interrogates aircraft on a frequency of 1030 MHz. This is done through a rotating or scanning antenna at the radar's assigned Pulse Repetition Frequency (PRF). Interrogations are typically performed at 450 - 500 interrogations/second. Once an interrogation has been transmitted, it travels through space (at the speed of light) in the direction the antenna is pointing until an aircraft is reached.

When the aircraft receives the interrogation, the aircraft transponder will send a reply on 1090 MHz after a 3.0 μs delay indicating the requested information. The interrogator's processor will then decode the reply and identify the aircraft. The range of the aircraft is determined from the delay between the reply and the interrogation. The azimuth of the aircraft is determined from the direction the antenna is pointing when the first reply was received, until the last reply is received. This window of azimuth values is then divided by two to give the calculated "centroid" azimuth. The errors in this algorithm cause the aircraft to jitter across the controllers scope, and is referred to as "track jitter." The jitter problem makes software tracking algorithms problematic, and is the reason why monopulse was implemented.

=== The interrogation ===
Interrogations consist of three pulses, 0.8 μs in duration, referred to as P1, P2 and P3. The timing between pulses P1 and P3 determines the mode (or question) of the interrogation, and thus what the nature of the reply should be. P2 is used in side-lobe suppression, explained later.

Mode 3/A uses a P1 to P3 spacing of 8.0 μs, and is used to request the beacon code, which was assigned to the aircraft by the controller to identify it. Mode C uses a spacing of 21 μs, and requests the aircraft's pressure altitude, provided by the altitude encoder. Mode 2 uses a spacing of 5 μs and requests the aircraft to transmit its Military identification code. The latter is only assigned to Military aircraft and so only a small percentage of aircraft actually reply to a mode 2 interrogation.

=== The reply ===
Replies to interrogations consist of 15 time slots, each 1.45 μs in width, encoding 12 + 1 bits of information. The reply is encoded by the presence or absence of a 0.45 μs pulse in each slot. These are labeled as follows:

F1 C1 A1 C2 A2 C4 A4 X B1 D1 B2 D2 B4 D4 F2 SPI

The F1 and F2 pulses are framing pulses, and are always transmitted by the aircraft transponder. They are used by the interrogator to identify legitimate replies. These are spaced 20.3 μs apart.

The A4, A2, A1, B4, B2, B1, C4, C2, C1, D4, D2, D1 pulses constitute the "information" contained in the reply. These bits are used in different ways for each interrogation mode.

For mode A, each digit in the transponder code (A, B, C, or D) may be a number from zero to seven. These octal digits are transmitted as groups of three pulses each, the A slots reserved for the first digit, B for the second, and so on.

In a mode C reply, the altitude is encoded by a Gillham interface, Gillham code, which uses Gray code. The Gillham interface is capable of representing a wide range of altitudes, in 100-foot (30 m) increments. The altitude transmitted is pressure altitude, and corrected for altimeter setting at the ATC facility. If no encoder is attached, the transponder may optionally transmit only framing pulses (most modern transponders do).

In a mode 3 reply, the information is the same as a mode A reply in that there are 4 digits transmitted between 0 and 7. The term mode 3 is utilized by the military, whereas mode A is the civilian term.

The X bit is currently only used for test targets. This bit was originally transmitted by BOMARC missiles that were used as air-launched test targets. This bit may be used by drone aircraft.

The SPI pulse is positioned 4.35μs past the F2 pulse (3 time slots) and is used as a "Special Identification Pulse". The SPI pulse is turned on by the "identity control" on the transponder in the aircraft cockpit when requested by air traffic control. The air traffic controller can request the pilot to ident, and when the identity control is activated, the SPI bit will be added to the reply for about 20 seconds (two to four rotations of the interrogator antenna) thereby highlighting the track on the controllers display.

==== Side lobe suppression ====
The SSR's directional antenna is never perfect; inevitably it will "leak" lower levels of RF energy in off-axis directions. These are known as side lobes. When aircraft are close to the ground station, the side lobe signals are often strong enough to elicit a reply from their transponders when the antenna is not pointing at them. This can cause ghosting, where an aircraft's target may appear in more than one location on the radar scope. In extreme cases, an effect known as ring-around occurs, where the transponder replies to excess resulting in an arc or circle of replies centered on the radar site.

To combat these effects, side lobe suppression (SLS) is used. SLS employs a third pulse, P2, spaced 2μs after P1. This pulse is transmitted from the omnidirectional antenna (or the antenna difference channel) by the ground station, rather than from the directional antenna (or the sum channel). The power output from the omnidirectional antenna is calibrated so that, when received by an aircraft, the P2 pulse is stronger than either P1 or P3, except when the directional antenna is pointing directly at the aircraft. By comparing the relative strengths of P2 and P1, airborne transponders can determine whether or not the antenna is pointing at the aircraft when the interrogation was received. The power to the difference antenna pattern (for systems so equipped) is not adjusted from that of the P1 and P3 pulses. Algorithms are used in the ground receivers to delete replies on the edge of the two beam patterns.

To combat these effects more recently, side lobe suppression (SLS) is still used, but differently. The new and improved SLS employs a third pulse, spaced 2μs either before P3 (a new P2 position) or after P3 (which should be called P4 and appears in the Mode S radar and TCAS specifications). This pulse is transmitted from the directional antenna at the ground station, and the power output of this pulse is the same strength as the P1 and P3 pulses. The action to be taken is specified in the new and improved C74c as:

2.6 Decoding Performance. c. Side-lobe Suppression. The transponder must be suppressed for a period of 35 ±10 microseconds following receipt of a pulse pair of proper spacing and suppression action must be capable of being reinitiated for the full duration within 2 microseconds after the end of any suppression period. The transponder must be suppressed with a 99 percent efficiency over a received signal amplitude range between 3 db above minimum triggering level and 50 db above that level and upon receipt of properly spaced interrogations when the received amplitude of P2 is equal to or in excess of the received amplitude of P1 and spaced 2.0 ±0.15 microsecond from P3.

Any requirement at the transponder to detect and act upon a P2 pulse 2μs after P1 has been removed from the new and improved TSO C74c specification.

Most "modern" transponders (manufactured since 1973) have an "SLS" circuit which suppresses reply on receipt of any two pulses in any interrogation spaced 2.0 microseconds apart that are above the MTL Minimum Triggering Level threshold of the receiver amplitude discriminator (P1->P2 or P2->P3 or P3->P4). This approach was used to comply with the original C74c and but also complies with the provisions of the new and improved C74c.

The FAA refers to the non-responsiveness of new and improved TSO C74c compliant transponders to Mode S compatible radars and TCAS as "The Terra Problem", and has issued Airworthiness Directives (ADs) against various transponder manufacturers, over the years, at various times on no predictable schedule. The ghosting and ring around problems have recurred on the more modern radars.

To combat these effects most recently, great emphasis is placed upon software solutions. It is highly likely that one of those software algorithms was the proximate cause of a mid-air collision recently, as one airplane was reported at showing its altitude as the pre-flight paper filed flight plan, and not the altitude assigned by the ATC controller (see the reports and observations contained in the below reference ATC Controlled Airplane Passenger Study of how radar worked).

See the reference section below for errors in performance standards for ATCRBS transponders in the US.

See the reference section below for FAA Technician Study of in-situ transponders.

== Radar display ==
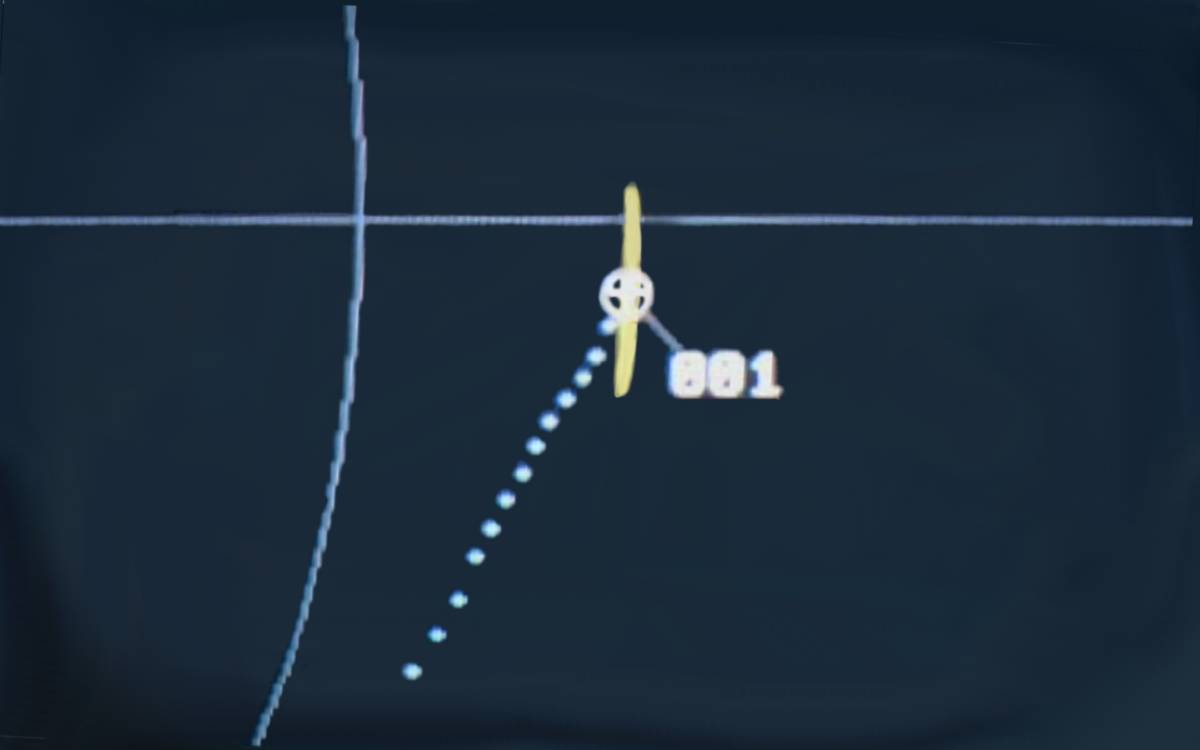
Detail of a radarscreen: a target in skin paint mode (amber) and as synthetic video (white)

The beacon code and altitude were historically displayed verbatim on the radar scope next to the target, however modernization has extended the radar data processor with a flight data processor, or FDP. The FDP automatically assigns beacon codes to flight plans, and when that beacon code is received from an aircraft, the computer can associate it with flight plan information to display immediately useful data, such as aircraft callsign, the aircraft's next navigational fix, assigned and current altitude, etc. near the target in a data block. Although the ATCRBS does not display aircraft heading.

== Mode S ==
Mode S, or mode select, despite also being called a mode, is actually a radically improved system intended to replace ATCRBS altogether. A few countries have mandated mode S, and many other countries, including the United States, have begun phasing out ATCRBS in favor of this system. Mode S is designed to be fully backward compatible with existing ATCRBS technology.

Mode S, despite being called a replacement transponder system for ATCRBS, is actually a data packet protocol which can be used to augment ATCRBS transponder positioning equipment (radar and TCAS).

One major improvement of Mode S is the ability to interrogate a single aircraft at a time. With old ATCRBS technology, all aircraft within the beam pattern of the interrogating station will reply. In an airspace with multiple interrogation stations, ATCRBS transponders in aircraft can be overwhelmed. By interrogating one aircraft at a time, workload on the aircraft transponder is greatly reduced.

The second major improvement is increased azimuth accuracy. With PSRs and old SSRs, azimuth of the aircraft is determined by the half split (centroid) method. The half split method is computed by recording the azimuth of the first and last replies from the aircraft, as the radar beam sweeps past its position. Then the midpoint between the start and stop azimuth is used for aircraft position. With MSSR (monopulse secondary surveillance radar) and Mode S, the radar can use the information of one reply to determine azimuth. This is calculated based on the RF phase of the aircraft reply, as determined by the sum and difference antenna elements, and is called monopulse. This monopulse method results in superior azimuth resolution, and removes target jitter from the display.

The Mode S system also includes a more robust communications protocol, for a wider variety of information exchange. As of 2009 this capability is becoming mandatory across Europe with some states already requiring its use.

=== Diversity Operations ===
Diversity Mode S transponders may be implemented for the purpose of improving air-to-air surveillance and communications. Such systems shall employ two antennas, one mounted on the top and the other on the bottom of the aircraft. Appropriate switching and signal processing channels to select the best antenna on the basis of the characteristics of the received interrogation signals shall also be provided. Such diversity systems, in their installed configuration, shall not result in degraded performance relative to that which would have been produced by a single system having a bottom-mounted antenna.

=== Frequency Congestion, FRUIT ===
Mode S was developed as a solution to frequency congestion on both the uplink and downlink frequencies (1030 and 1090 MHz). The high coverage of radar service available today means that some radar sites receive transponder replies from interrogations that were initiated by other nearby radar sites. This results in FRUIT, or False Replies Unsynchronous In Time, which is the reception of replies at a ground station that do not correspond with an interrogation. This problem has worsened with the increasing prevalence of technologies like TCAS, in which individual aircraft interrogate one another to avoid collisions. Finally, technology improvements have made transponders increasingly affordable such that today almost all aircraft are equipped with them. As a result, the sheer number of aircraft replying to SSRs has increased. Defruiter circuitry clears FRUIT from the display.

=== Mode S as a Congestion Solution ===
Mode S attempts to reduce these problems by assigning aircraft a permanent mode S address, derived from the aircraft's internationally assigned registration number. It then provides a mechanism by which an aircraft can be selected, or interrogated such that no other aircraft reply.

The system also has provisions for transferring arbitrary data both to and from a transponder. This aspect of mode S makes it a building block for many other technologies, such as TCAS 2, Traffic Information Service (TIS), and Automatic Dependent Surveillance-Broadcast.

== See also ==
- Acronyms and abbreviations in avionics
