= Mode C veil =

Type of airspace at airports in the United States

Mode C veil refers to a kind of airspace which currently surrounds all primary Class B airports within the United States. This airspace extends horizontally to a circle of 30 NM radius centered on the airport, and extends vertically from the surface up to 10,000 feet MSL. The name refers to the mode of transponder operation which is required within this airspace — that is, with very limited exceptions, all aircraft operating within this airspace must have an altitude-reporting Mode C transponder in operation. An additional requirement for the transponder to have ADS-B Out became effective January 1, 2020.

As of August 2017, all 37 Class B airports in the United States have Mode C veils centered on them. Prior to November 2014, two Class B airports did not have a Mode C veil (at least de jure): William P. Hobby Airport in Houston and Marine Corps Air Station Miramar in San Diego.

Mode C veils were implemented after the collision of Aeroméxico Flight 498 and a Piper Archer on August 31, 1986, within the terminal control area of Los Angeles airport.
