= Aviation transponder interrogation modes =

Standard formats of pulsed sequences for aviation transponders

The aviation transponder interrogation modes are the standard formats of pulsed sequences from an interrogating Secondary Surveillance Radar (SSR) or similar Automatic Dependent Surveillance-Broadcast (ADS-B) system. The reply format is usually referred to as a "code" from a transponder, which is used to determine detailed information from a suitably equipped aircraft.

In its simplest form, a "Mode" or interrogation type is generally determined by pulse spacing between two or more interrogation pulses. Various modes exist from Mode 1 to 5 for military use, to Mode A, B, C and D, and Mode S for civilian use.

== Interrogation modes ==
Several different RF communication protocols have been standardized for aviation transponders:

Military mode	Civilian mode	Description
1		Provides 2-digit 5-bit mission code (cockpit selectable)
2		Provides 4-digit octal unit code (set on ground for fighters, can be changed in flight by transport aircraft)
3	A	Provides a 4-digit octal identification code for the aircraft, set in the cockpit but assigned by the air traffic controller. Mode 3/A is often combined with Mode C to provide altitude information as well.
3	C	Provides the aircraft's pressure altitude and is usually combined with Mode 3/A to provide a combination of a 4-digit octal code and altitude as Mode 3 A/C, often referred to as Mode A and C
4		Provides a 3-pulse reply, delay is based on the encrypted challenge
5		Provides a cryptographically secured version of Mode S and ADS-B GPS position
S		Provides multiple information formats to a selective interrogation. Each aircraft is assigned a fixed 24-bit address.

Mode A and Mode C are implemented using air traffic control radar beacon system as the physical layer, whereas Mode S is implemented as a standalone backwards-compatible protocol. ADS-B can operate using Mode S-ES or Universal Access Transceiver as its transport layer:

		ADS-B	
		Mode S-ES	UAT
Mode A	Mode C	Mode S	UAT
ATCRBS		Mode S	UAT

=== Mode A ===
When the transponder receives an interrogation request, it broadcasts the configured transponder code (or "squawk code"). This is referred to as "Mode 3A" or more commonly, Mode A. A separate type of response called "Ident" can be initiated from the airplane by pressing a button on the transponder control panel.

=== Mode A with Mode C ===
A Mode A transponder code response can be augmented by a pressure altitude response, which is then referred to as Mode C operation. Pressure altitude is obtained from an altitude encoder, either a separate self-contained unit mounted in the aircraft or an integral part of the transponder. The altitude information is passed to the transponder using a modified form of the modified Gray code called a Gillham code.

Mode A and C responses are used to help air traffic controllers identify a particular aircraft's position and altitude on a radar screen, in order to maintain separation.

=== Mode S ===
Another mode called Mode S (Select) is designed to help avoiding overinterrogation of the transponder (having many radars in busy areas) and to allow automatic collision avoidance. Mode S transponders are compatible with Mode A and Mode C Secondary Surveillance Radar (SSR) systems. This is the type of transponder that is used for TCAS or ACAS II (Airborne Collision Avoidance System) functions, and is required to implement the extended squitter broadcast, one means of participating in ADS-B systems. A TCAS-equipped aircraft must have a Mode S transponder, but not all Mode S transponders include TCAS. Likewise, a Mode S transponder is required to implement 1090ES extended squitter ADS-B Out, but there are other ways to implement ADS-B Out (in the U.S. and China.) The format of Mode S messages is documented in ICAO Doc 9688, Manual on Mode S Specific Services.

==== Mode S features ====
Upon interrogation, Mode S transponders transmit information about the aircraft to the SSR system, to TCAS receivers on board aircraft and to the ADS-B SSR system. This information includes the call sign of the aircraft and/or the aircraft's permanent ICAO 24-bit address (which is represented for human interface purposes as six hexadecimal characters.) One of the hidden features of Mode S transponders is that they are backwards compatible; an aircraft equipped with a Mode S transponder can still be used to send replies to Mode A or C interrogations. This feature can be activated by a specific type of interrogation sequence called inter-mode.

===== ICAO 24-bit address =====
Mode S equipped aircraft are assigned a unique ICAO 24-bit address or (informally) Mode-S "hex code" upon national registration and this address becomes a part of the aircraft's Certificate of Registration. Normally, the address is never changed, however, the transponders are reprogrammable and, occasionally, are moved from one aircraft to another (presumably for operational or cost purposes), either by maintenance or by changing the appropriate entry in the aircraft's Flight management system.

There are 16,777,214 (2^{24}-2) unique ICAO 24-bit addresses (hex codes) available. The ICAO 24-bit address can be represented in three digital formats: hexadecimal, octal, and binary. These addresses are used to provide a unique identity normally allocated to an individual aircraft or registration.

As an example, following is the ICAO 24-bit address assigned to the Shuttle Carrier Aircraft with the registration N905NA:

- Hexadecimal: AC82EC
- Octal: 53101354
- Binary: 101011001000001011101100 (Note: occasionally, spaces are added for visual clarity, thus 1010 1100 1000 0010 1110 1100 {Hex big endian} and 001 101 110 100 000 100 110 101 {Octal little endian})
- Decimal: 11305708

These are all the same 24-bit address of the Shuttle Carrier Aircraft, represented in different numeral systems (see above).

==== Issues with Mode S transponders ====
An issue with Mode S transponders arises when pilots enter the wrong flight identity code into the Mode S transponder. In this case, the capabilities of ACAS II and Mode S SSR can be degraded.

==== Extended squitter ====
In 2009 the ICAO published an "extended" form of Mode S with more message formats to use with ADS-B; it was further refined in 2012. Countries implementing ADS-B can require the use of either the extended squitter mode of a suitably-equipped Mode S transponder, or the UAT transponder on 978 MHz.

==== Use in meteorology ====
Mode-S data has the potential to contain the aircraft's movement vectors in relation to the Earth and its atmosphere. The difference between these two vectors is the wind acting on the aircraft. Deriving winds (and temperatures from the Mach number and true airspeed) was developed simultaneously by Siebren de Haan of the KNMI and Edmund Stone of the Met Office. Over the UK the number of aircraft observations has increased from approximately 7500 per day from AMDAR to over 10 million per day. The Met Office together with KNMI and FlightRadar24 are actively developing an expanded capability including data from every continent other than Antarctica.

== See also ==
- Identification friend or foe
