= Transponder (aeronautics) =

Airborne radio transponder

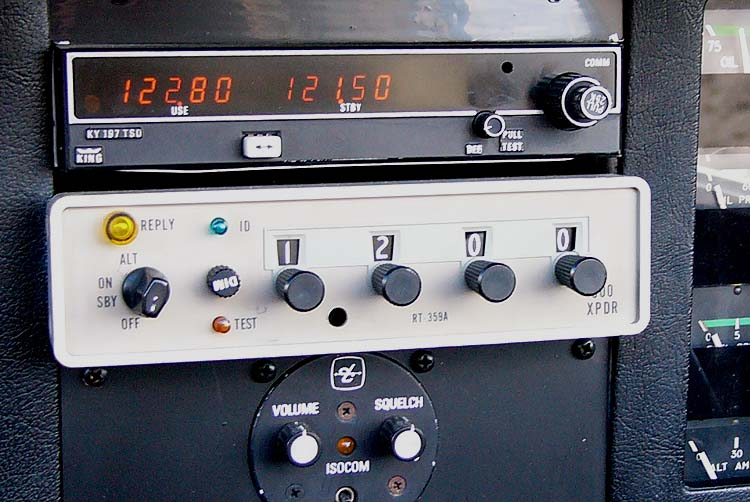
Cessna ARC RT-359A transponder (beige box), beneath a VHF radio. In this example, the transponder code selected is 1200 for VFR flight (in North American airspace). The green IDENT button is marked "ID".

A transponder (short for transmitter-responder and sometimes abbreviated to XPDR, XPNDR, TPDR or TP) is an electronic device that produces a response when it receives a radio-frequency interrogation. Aircraft have transponders to assist in identifying them on air traffic control radar. Collision avoidance systems have been developed to use transponder transmissions as a means of detecting aircraft at risk of colliding with each other.

Air traffic control (ATC) units use the term "squawk" when they are assigning an aircraft a transponder code, e.g., "Squawk 7421". "Squawk" thus can be said to mean "select transponder code" and "squawking xxxx" to mean "I have selected transponder code xxxx".

The transponder receives interrogation from the secondary surveillance radar on 1030 MHz and replies on 1090 MHz.

== Secondary surveillance radar ==
Secondary surveillance radar (SSR) is referred to as "secondary", to distinguish it from the "primary radar" that works by reflecting a radio signal off the skin of the aircraft. Primary radar determines range and bearing to a target with reasonably high fidelity, but it cannot determine target elevation (altitude) reliably except at close range. SSR uses an active transponder (beacon) to transmit a response to an interrogation by a secondary radar. This response most often includes the aircraft's pressure altitude and a 4-digit octal identifier.

== Operation ==
A pilot may be requested to squawk a given code by an air traffic controller, via the radio, using a phrase such as "Cessna 123AB, squawk 0363". The pilot then selects the 0363 code on their transponder and the track on the air traffic controller's radar screen will become correctly associated with their identity.

Because primary radar generally gives bearing and range position information, but lacks altitude information, mode C and mode S transponders also report pressure altitude. Mode C altitude information conventionally comes from the pilot's altimeter, and is transmitted using a modified Gray code, called a Gillham code. Where the pilot's altimeter does not contain a suitable altitude encoder, a blind encoder (which does not directly display altitude) is connected to the transponder. Around busy airspace there is often a regulatory requirement that all aircraft be equipped with altitude-reporting mode C or mode S transponders. In the United States, this is known as a Mode C veil. Mode S transponders are compatible with transmitting the mode C signal, and have the capability to report in 25-foot (7.5 m) increments; they receive information from a GPS receiver and also transmit location and speed. Without the pressure altitude reporting, the air traffic controller has no display of accurate altitude information, and must rely on the altitude reported by the pilot via radio. Similarly, the traffic collision avoidance system (TCAS) installed on some aircraft needs the altitude information supplied by transponder signals.

== IDENT ==
All mode A, C, and S transponders include an "IDENT" switch which activates a special thirteenth bit on the mode A reply known as IDENT, short for "identify". When ground-based radar equipment receives the IDENT bit, it results in the aircraft's blip "blossoming" on the radar scope. This is often used by the controller to locate the aircraft amongst others by requesting the ident function from the pilot, e.g., "Cessna 123AB, squawk 0363 and ident".

Ident can also be used in case of a reported or suspected radio failure to determine if the failure is only one way and whether the pilot can still transmit or receive, but not both, e.g., "Cessna 123AB, if you read, squawk ident".

== Transponder codes ==
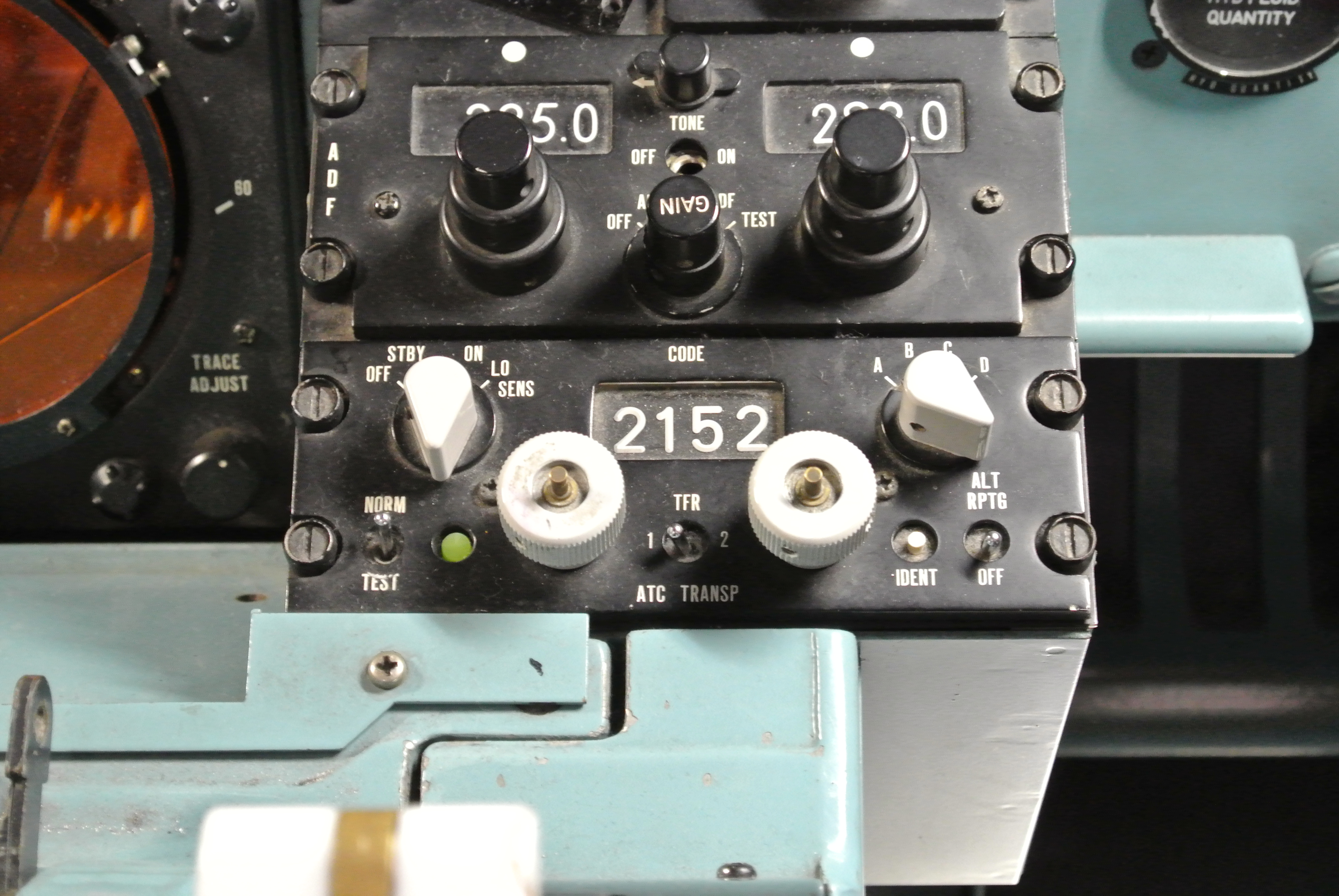
Transponder in a McDonnell Douglas DC-9 squawking 2152

Transponder codes are four-digit numbers transmitted by an aircraft transponder in response to a secondary surveillance radar interrogation signal to assist air traffic controllers with traffic separation. A discrete transponder code (often called a squawk code) is assigned by air traffic controllers to identify an aircraft uniquely in a flight information region (FIR). This allows easy identification of aircraft on radar.

Codes are made of four octal digits; the dials on a transponder read from 0 to 7. Four octal digits can represent 4,096 different codes, which is why such transponders are sometimes described as "4096 code transponders".

The use of the word "squawk" comes from the system's origin in the World War II identification friend or foe (IFF) system, which was code-named "Parrot".

=== Codes assigned by air traffic control ===
Some codes can be selected by the pilot if and when the situation requires or allows it, without permission from ATC. Such codes are referred to as "conspicuity codes" in the UK. Other codes are generally assigned by ATC units. For flights on instrument flight rules (IFR), the squawk code is typically assigned as part of the departure clearance and stays the same throughout the flight.

Flights on visual flight rules (VFR), when in uncontrolled airspace, will "squawk VFR" (1200 in North America, 7000 in Europe). Upon contact with an ATC unit, they will be told to squawk a certain code. When changing frequency, for instance because the VFR flight leaves controlled airspace or changes to another ATC unit, the VFR flight will be told to "squawk VFR" again.

In order to avoid confusion over assigned squawk codes, ATC units will typically be allocated blocks of squawk codes, not overlapping with the blocks of nearby ATC units, to assign at their discretion.

Not all ATC units will use radar to identify aircraft, but they assign squawk codes nevertheless. As an example, London Information—the flight information service station that covers England and Wales—does not have access to radar images, but does assign squawk code 1177 to all aircraft that receive a flight information service (FIS) from them. This tells other radar-equipped ATC units that a specific aircraft is listening on the London Information radio frequency, in case they need to contact that aircraft.

=== Emergency codes ===
The following codes are applicable worldwide.

Code	Use
7500	Aircraft hijacking (ICAO)
7600	Radio failure (lost communications) (ICAO)
7700	Emergency (ICAO)

== Transponder-related incidents ==
- Aeroméxico Flight 498 – August 31, 1986 (one of the aircraft equipped with a Mode A, but not Mode C, transponder)
- Iran Air Flight 655 – July 3, 1988 (incorrect interpretation of transponder code, a factor in mistaken identity and shoot-down)
- Proteus Airlines Flight 706 – July 30, 1998 (mid-air collision; one of the aircraft had its transponder switched off)
- Korean Air Flight 085 – September 11, 2001 (suspected hijack involving the transponder code, false alarm)
- Gol Transportes Aéreos Flight 1907 – September 29, 2006 (midair collision; one of the aircraft had its transponder accidentally switched off)

== See also ==
- Automatic Dependent Surveillance–Broadcast
- Aviation transponder interrogation modes
- Flight tracking
