= Capstone Program =

US aviation safety program

The Capstone Program was a United States government-funded aviation safety program for the state of Alaska, primarily focusing on rural areas of the state. This joint effort – between the Federal Aviation Administration (FAA), the Alaska Pilot's Association, commercial operators, the University of Alaska, MITRE Corporation, some avionics manufacturers and individual pilots – cut the accident rate in the eastern part of Alaska by around 40%.

The program ran from 1999 until 2006, when the FAA integrated it into the national automatic dependent surveillance – broadcast (ADS–B) program.

== Background ==
Alaska is the largest state in the United States by area, but is one of the smallest in population. In the late 1990s, one out of every 58 people in the state was a pilot, with six airplanes for every ten pilots. With a very limited highway and railroad infrastructure, aviation emerged as an essential (and sometimes the only) transportation system. However, the vital infrastructure supporting aviation fell short of the standards commonly expected or encountered elsewhere in the US.

== History ==
=== Flight 2000 proposal and program development ===
In early 1997, the US Federal Aviation Administration (FAA) began developing a proposal entitled "Flight 2000". This proposal envisioned rapid deployment and field demonstration of advanced avionics capabilities leading toward implementation of free flight. The proposal was not well received by all segments of the aviation industry, and the industry's RTCA (Radio Technical Commission for Aeronautics) Select Committee on Free Flight endorsed a revised approach that included most Flight 2000 program activities. The revised approach was documented in the "Joint Government/Industry Roadmap for Free Flight Operational Enhancements".

Within the Alaskan Region, Flight 2000 served as the "capstone" for many additional initiatives, providing a common umbrella for planning, coordination, focus, and direction with regard to development of the future National Airspace System (NAS). A few additional "technology-driven" initiatives supportive of Flight 2000 are recommended in a March 1995 National Transportation Safety Board (NTSB) Alaska Safety Study, inextricably linked to the earlier proposal. As an example, the additional aviation weather observing systems the NTSB called for in Alaska relies on the Flight 2000 Flight Information System element to provide the information developed via data link to the pilot.

A key objective of Flight 2000 had been to accelerate implementation and use of modern technology; however, uncertainties surrounding that program actually slowed the transition. Several Alaskan avionics installers reported customers seeking to acquire GPS equipment deferred investing as they waited for Flight 2000.

=== Program implementation ===
Within Alaska, Capstone linked several initiatives to coordinate between the FAA, community, and industry. Capstone outlined the process and scope for upgrading the operating infrastructure with airports, weather products, communications, and GPS-driven systems.

A major objective was to improve safety in Alaska while offering efficiencies to operators. Many accidents could be eliminated through improved situational awareness for both pilots and controllers. For this reason, the Alaskan Region supported efforts to enhance the NAS and become a test bed for new technology. A study of 112 air-carrier accidents during a three-year period in Alaska indicated a likely 38% safety improvement from modern technology.

The Free Flight Operational Enhancements Program (FFOEP) identified nine enhancements. Although field deployment of these enhancements was not scheduled to begin in Alaska until the fiscal year 2000, a limited early deployment was within reach and highly desirable. It was thought that early deployment would have a positive effect on safety, create an infrastructure to permit initial procedure development, familiarize flight crews, controllers, and avionics installers with modern equipment and concepts, and address certification issues and procedures prior to the actual start of the FFOEP evaluation. Early deployment would also serve to validate the overall concept identified in the joint Government/Industry Roadmap.

During the fiscal year 1999, the Alaskan Region's "Capstone" Program tied together three of the nine principal elements identified in the "Joint Government/Industry Roadmap for Free Flight Operational Enhancements" with two safety initiatives from the March 1995 NTSB Alaska Safety Study. Operational enhancements included in Project Capstone are:

- flight information system for special use airspace, weather, windshear, NOTAMs (Notices to Airmen), and pilot reports
- cost-effective controlled flight into terrain (CFIT) avoidance through graphical position display
- enhanced "see and avoid" visual flight rules (VFR)

The concept of conducting a real-world demonstration of these and other capabilities in Alaska was originally proposed for inclusion in the FAA's Flight 2000 Program.

The Alaskan Region identified the following FFOEP elements and related NTSB safety improvements for limited deployment in the fiscal year 1999:

- The Alaskan Region's Capstone Program brought together several initiatives, some ongoing, some proposed, in order to make the flying community safer and more efficient while validating the deployment and operation of technology in the Bethel hub and surrounding area. It supports planning efforts of the FFOEP developed by the RTCA Select Committee by providing a cost-effective and efficient method to demonstrate the program's implementation processes.
- A Capstone Field Office was established in Anchorage, reporting to the Alaskan Regional Administrator to plan, coordinate and implement the project. Infrastructure and interim procedures and certification processes would be developed in conjunction with the respective Alaskan Region Divisions responsible for them. Equipage of evaluation aircraft would be voluntary, with the Capstone program absorbing the cost of equipping and certifying. Capstone built an infrastructure consistent with the FFOEP, thereby enabling further procedure development and evaluation leading toward overall modernization.

The Capstone program consisted of two phases in different geographical areas of Alaska. Phase 1, which was conceived in 1998 and implemented in 1999, was centered in the Yukon–Kuskokwim (Y–K) Delta area of southwestern Alaska. Phase 2, which began in 2001, encompassed Southeast Alaska. Phase 3 would be implemented statewide using the technologies developed and proven in Phase 1 and 2.

==== Phase 1 ====
The Y–K Delta area of southwestern Alaska, the focal point for Capstone's Phase 1 activities, typified most of the state in terms of transportation infrastructure. No roads connected the more than fifty villages in the 100,000 square miles (260,000 km^{2}) area, and even within the villages, there were few roads. The community of Bethel, the aviation hub and largest settlement in the area, had only 15 miles (24 km) of mostly unpaved roads.

Under Phase 1, a fleet of small commercial aircraft evaluated safety benefits of technologies during day-to-day operations in Alaska. The aircraft was fitted with instrument flight rules (IFR) capable GPS receivers, a universal access transceiver (UAT) data-link system that enabled automatic dependent surveillance – broadcast (ADS–B), and flight information service (FIS) including real-time weather, and a multifunction display (MFD) depicting terrain, other ADS–B aircraft, weather graphics and text data. The bundle of avionics were installed on 200 aircraft used for commuting, chartering, and mail flights in southwest Alaska. The avionics improved the pilot's situational awareness with the primary goal of preventing controlled flight into terrain (CFIT) and mid-air accidents.

The lack of a usable IFR infrastructure and radar coverage combined with the harsh weather conditions caused Alaska to have a high rate of CFIT accidents. Pilots, departing for VFR-only destinations with the intention of maintaining visual separation with terrain or water, continued flying toward their destination after encountering marginal weather conditions which would normally involve instrument flight operations. The terrain-awareness function of the Capstone avionics provided ground proximity functionality. The terrain function showed terrain via an intuitive high-resolution color display using black, green, yellow and red to indicate the proximity of the terrain to the aircraft. The avionics continuously monitored the aircraft's altitude, GPS-derived position, ground speed, and route of flight, and compared this data to a built-in database of terrain elevation. The display automatically provided a terrain advisory to the pilot if the aircraft was within two minutes of a close encounter with the ground.

Second to CFIT accidents was mid-air collisions. Capstone sought to address this by using ADS–B technology to reduce airborne collisions. ADS–B-equipped aircraft continuously broadcast their position whether they are flying or taxiing on the airport surface. Displayed on the multifunction display, ADS–B gave pilots a clear view of the other ADS–B traffic around them. When the Capstone aircraft were flown to a radar service area, such as exists in Anchorage, a capability called Traffic Information Service – Broadcast (TIS–B) depicted non-ADS–B aircraft on the MFD as well.

A network of data-link ground-stations has been installed at eleven existing FAA and joint-use military facilities in the Phase 1 region, and connected via existing communications systems to the Anchorage Air Route Traffic Control Center. The existing Micro Enroute Automated Radar Tracking System (Micro-EARTS) had been programmed to depict ADS–B targets on the air traffic controller displays fused with radar targets. ADS–B aircraft position reports were also made available to airport traffic controllers in Bethel and to the commercial-aircraft operators via the Internet for flight-monitoring purposes.

As part of the initial Capstone initiative, the FAA purchased, installed, and maintained the avionics for the 5-year evaluation period. In return, participants assisted the program by providing evaluation data so that safety and operational benefits could be identified and documented. Ownership of the avionics was transferred to the participating operators in December 2004. The initial evaluation concentrated on an affordable means to reduce CFIT and provide the pilot with an enhanced means to see nearby traffic and receive current weather in the cockpit.

The Capstone program provided training for pilots, operators, safety inspectors, air traffic control specialists, and technicians to ensure that the greatest benefits resulting from evaluation activities were realized. To support this technology, 19 GPS stand-alone non-precision instrument approach procedures were prepared and published for runways of ten remote village airports within the Phase 1 evaluation area. Also, an automated weather observation system (AWOS) was installed at these airports to enable air-carrier use of the new non-precision GPS instrument approach procedures.

The natural boundaries of the Y–K Delta confined the operation of most of the participating aircraft to the area, with Bethel as the operating hub, and also limits the radar coverage below 6,000 feet (from sea level). Capstone provided an IFR infrastructure for Bethel and nine additional airports in the Y–K Delta, and made radar-like ADS–B coverage possible throughout the area. To enable air traffic services (ATS) to use ADS–B in the Bethel non-radar environment, Anchorage Air Route Traffic Control Center's equipment was modified to display ADS–B data together with available radar on the air traffic controller display.

To document the results, Capstone enlisted the help of the University of Alaska at Anchorage (UAA) and the MITRE Corporation. The university documented a baseline of current operations and tracked, evaluated and documented the improvements as they occurred. UAA also provided crew training on the Capstone avionics equipment. The initial results showed a 40 percent reduction in accidents had resulted from the Capstone Program.

==== Phase 2 ====
Under Phase 2, the Capstone Program concentrated efforts in the terrain-constrained area of Southeast Alaska. Again, in partnership with the aviation industry, Capstone worked to improve safety and access to that area using lessons learned from the Phase 1 program in the Y–K Delta, as well as incorporating other technologies to further improve surveillance and navigation capability. Phase 2 also included a demonstration of technology aimed at reducing the potential for runway incursion accidents. In addition to the CFIT and mid-air concerns one of the critical elements needed in Southeast Alaska was a usable IFR infrastructure.

Southeast Alaska is a very rugged environment of mountains and ocean. Forested islands create the state's famous Inside Passage. In many areas the ocean comes directly up to the base of tall, majestic mountains capped by glaciers and ice fields. Although access to most settlements in the Southeast is available by boat, the lengthy travel time makes it impractical for everyday and emergency use. A less-than-two-hour journey from Ketchikan to Juneau by air requires sixteen hours by boat, and a voyage on the ferry from Bellingham, Washington to Juneau, Alaska takes over 50 hours.

Over 45 communities are scattered throughout Southeast Alaska on islands and the mainland. Juneau, the capital, is the largest. Only three of the cities, Haines, Hyder and Skagway, are reachable by road via the Alaska–Canadian Highway. Even these, because of the lengthy drive, depend on aviation for most of their transportation needs.

Flying in this area was very different due to the constraints of the terrain. The Minimum En Route Altitude (MEA) of the airways were typically above the altitudes that the general aviation fleet of aircraft could safely fly without encountering icing conditions, even in the summer.

Legacy en route navigation aids required land-based sites where power was available and maintenance crews had access. This land-based system resulted in a traditional IFR route structure that was not optimized for the terrain or typical small aircraft users in Southeast Alaska. The technology that changed this and put the routes and approaches where they were needed, at low altitudes over the fjords, was the Wide Area Augmentation System (WAAS).

Basic GPS service failed to meet the accuracy, availability, and integrity (the ability of a system to provide timely warnings to users or to shut itself down when it should not be used for navigation) requirements critical to safety of flight. The bottom line for assessing a navigation system is its "availability". A system that fails to meet prescribed standards for accuracy, integrity, or other specifications is not truly available for use, although even the raw GPS signal in Alaska was better than the FAA's legacy systems. The traditional VHF omnidirectional range (VOR) and automatic direction finder (ADF) ground-based en-route system has an availability rate of 98.5%. The GPS signal had an availability of about 99.9% and was available over a much wider area.

Being able to receive the WAAS signal improves basic GPS accuracy to approximately 7 meters (23 ft) vertically and horizontally, improves system availability through the use of navigation satellites placed in geostationary Earth orbits (GEOs) and provides important integrity information about the entire GPS constellation.

WAAS provides the safety-critical navigation system that allowed the Capstone program to design airways and approaches where they can be best-used by the aviation industry in Southeast Alaska. Capstone utilized WAAS receivers on all participating aircraft. The WAAS signal was the basis for new IFR routes and procedures that were designed to serve low-flying aircraft throughout Southeast Alaska. The first air-carrier validation flights by Harris Air, located at Sitka, Alaska, took place in March 2005 and resulted in FAA approval.

WAAS delivered the safety assurances essential for building a new U.S. navigation and air traffic management system based on cost-effective satellite technology. The WAAS signal, which has been available for several years for non-critical use has an availability rate of 99.999%.

Capstone worked with the WAAS program office to help provide the WAAS signal to the Phase 2 Capstone equipment. Certification and initial installations of Capstone Phase 2 WAAS avionics took place in 2002.

Introduction of WAAS-based navigation and surveillance capabilities also required new regulatory provisions. On March 13, 2003, Special Federal Aviation Regulation (FAR) Part 97 was approved by FAA authorizing en-route IFR navigation in Alaska based solely on satellite technology without reference to ground radio-navigation stations.

New WAAS routes were also designed and charted to serve the entire state of Alaska. Conflict within the Air Traffic Organization resulted in the WAAS routes being NOTAMed out of service and later removed from public charting.

=== End ===
In 2006, the FAA integrated the Alaskan Capstone project into the national Automatic Dependent Surveillance – Broadcast (ADS–B) program.
