= MasFlight =

Aviation software and data services company based in Bethesda, Maryland, US

masFlight
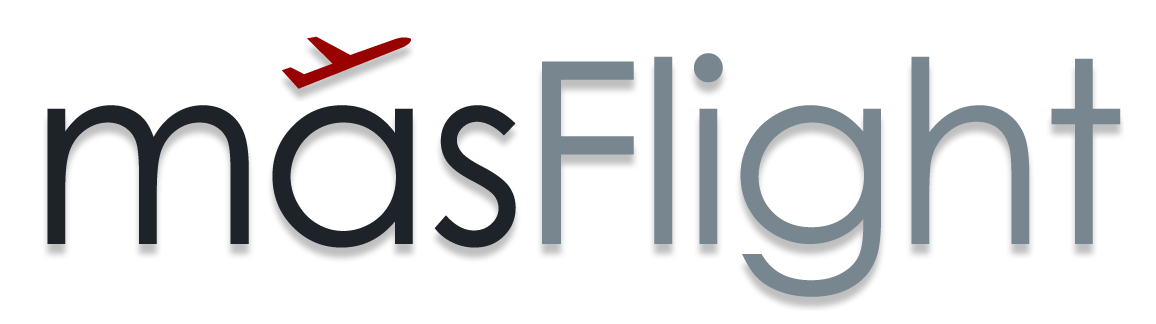
- Company type: Subsidiary
- Founded: 2010
- Headquarters: Bethesda, Maryland
- Key people: Joshua Marks, Founder/CEO; Tulinda Larsen, President; Rodrigo Navarro, Founder/CTO; Edmund Otubuah, Founder/VP; Lee Jones, VP Solutions
- Industry: Aviation
- Parent: Global Eagle Entertainment
- Website: http://masFlight.com
- Current status: Active

masFlight was a US cloud-based, big data, SaaS aviation software and data services company based in Bethesda, Maryland, with offices in Reston, Virginia and Ontario, California. The company was founded in 2010 and was acquired by Global Eagle Entertainment on August 4, 2015. The company is now part of the GEE Operations Solutions business unit. masFlight focused on the collection and analysis of large amounts of commercial aircraft operational data globally, from sources such as global flight information systems, schedules, ADS-B and proprietary information sources. masFlight's technology used the cloud to store daily flight profiles and tracks of individual commercial aircraft. The company sold this data and analysis to airlines and related parties such as aircraft lessors and aircraft OEMs.

masFlight is a Strategic Partner of the International Air Transport Association (IATA)

The company was regularly cited in media reports on commercial aviation issues, including the Wall St Journal, CNBC, CNN, TIME Magazine and Bloomberg News.
