= DO-242A =

US aviation system standard

Minimum Aviation System Performance Standards for Automatic Dependent Surveillance Broadcast (ADS-B)
- Abbreviation: DO-242A
- Latest version: June 25, 2002
- Organization: RTCA SC-186
- Domain: Aviation
- Website: my.rtca.org

DO-242A is an aviation system standard published by RTCA, Incorporated. It contains minimum aviation system performance standards (MASPS) for Automatic Dependent Surveillance-Broadcast (ADS-B). These standards specify operational characteristics that should be useful to designers, manufacturers, installers, service providers and users of an ADS-B system intended for operational use on an international basis. DO-242A provides a view of the system-wide operational use of ADS-B, but does not describe a specific technical implementation or design architecture meeting these operational and technical characteristics.

== See also ==
- Automatic Dependent Surveillance-Broadcast
- DO-212, Minimum Operational Performance Standards for Airborne ADS Equipment
- DO-185A, Minimum Operational Performance Standards for Traffic Alert and Collision Avoidance System (TCAS) Airborne Equipment
- DO-184, Traffic Alert Collision Avoidance System (TCAS) I Functional Guidelines
- DO-236A, Minimum Aviation System Performance Standards: Required Navigation Performance for Area Navigation
- DO-243, Guidance for Initial Implementation of Cockpit Display of Traffic Information
- DO-229D, Minimum Operational Performance Standards for Global Positioning System/Wide Area Augmentation System Airborne Equipment
- DO-260, Minimum Operational Performance Standards for 1090 MHz Automatic Dependent Surveillance - Broadcast (ADS-B)
- DO-259, Application Descriptions for Initial Cockpit Display of Traffic Information (CDTI) Applications
- DO-246B, GNSS-Based Precision Approach Local Area Augmentation System (LAAS) Signal-in-Space Interface Control Document (ICD)
- DO-253, Minimum Operational Performance Standards for GPS Local Area Augmentation System Airborne Equipment
- DO-245, Minimum Aviation System Performance Standards for the Local Area Augmentation System (LAAS)
