= Advance Passenger Information System =

System for recording US border crossings

The Advance Passenger Information System (APIS) is an electronic data interchange system established by U.S. Customs and Border Protection (CBP).

APIS governs the provision of a limited number of data elements (identification details from the passport and basic flight information) from commercial airline and vessel operators to the computer system of the destination state. Required information should conform to specifications for UN/EDIFACT Passenger List Message (PAXLST) formats.

Beginning in May 2009, private aircraft pilots must also provide the necessary information to CBP. The regulations were put into effect in December 2008 with a 180-day voluntary compliance period.

eAPIS (electronic APIS) is a public website which allows small commercial carriers to transmit data to CBP electronically.

When traveling to or from certain countries, passengers are required to provide advance passenger information (API) before they check in or they will be unable to fly. These countries include

- Antigua
- Australia
- Austria
- Barbados
- Belgium
- Brazil
- Canada
- China
- Costa Rica
- Cuba
- Dominican Republic
- France
- Germany
- Grenada
- India
- Indonesia
- Ireland
- Italy
- Jamaica
- Japan
- Maldives
- Mexico
- Myanmar
- New Zealand
- Panama
- Portugal
- Republic of Korea
- Russian Federation
- Saint Lucia
- South Korea
- Spain (except for Schengen Area passengers)
- Sweden
- Taiwan
- Thailand
- Trinidad & Tobago
- Turkey
- United Kingdom
- United States
- Vietnam

and some more

The required information consists of:

- Full name (last name, first name, middle name if applicable)
- Gender
- Date of birth
- Nationality
- Country of residence
- Travel document type (normally passport)
- Travel document number (expiry date and country of issue for passport)
- [For travelers to the US] Address of the first night spent in the US (not required for US citizens/nationals, legal permanent residents, or alien residents of the US entering the US)

== See also ==
- Automated Targeting System
- Fltplan.com
- Immigration Advisory Program
- Passenger name record
- Travel visa
- Work visa
