= Traffic information service – broadcast =

Aviation information service

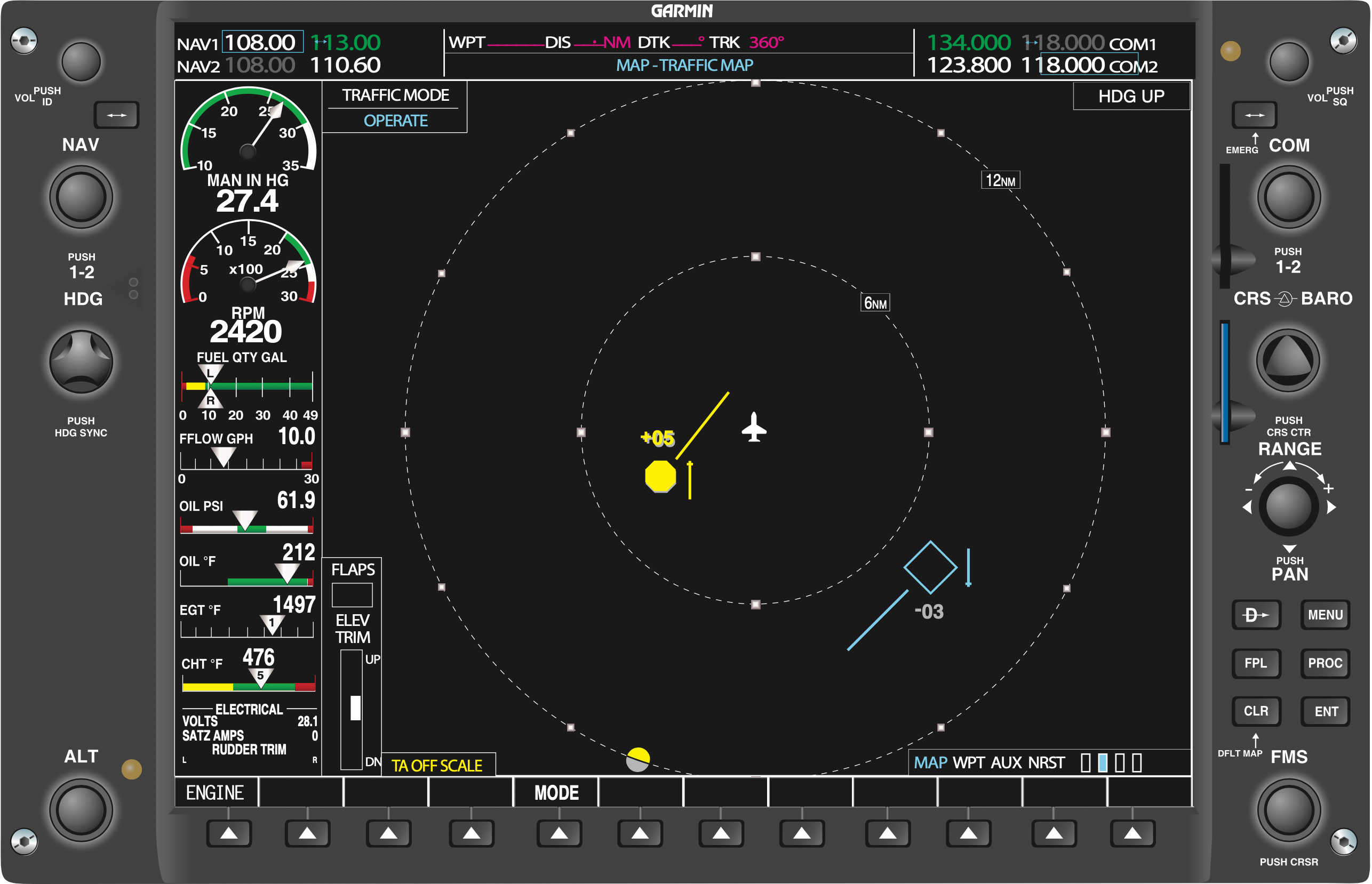
TIS-B information displayed on a multi-function display showing two nearby traffic

Traffic information service – broadcast (TIS–B) is an aviation information service that allows pilots to see aircraft that are not emitting ADS-B data but have a basic transponder.

As aircraft are discovered by primary radar and respond with encoded altitude information, this information is broadcast over ADS-B. These near real time positions and ground tracks of other nearby aircraft are provided for the purpose of collision avoidance. It presents to the pilot a combined representation of aircraft positions derived from GPS satellite and ground-based radar data, specifically: aircraft's replies to ATC interrogations (i.e., they are responses to queries as sent to the aircraft from air traffic controller on the ground).

TIS-B is broadcast to aircraft using both the 1090 MHz extended squitter (1090 ES) and the universal access transceiver (UAT) band of Automatic Dependent Surveillance–Broadcast (ADS-B). Currently the service mainly benefits general aviation (GA) aircraft equipped with ADS-B "in" hardware by providing a traffic information relay to a screen in the cockpit.

At this time TIS–B is meant to be only a supplement to visual separation from other aircraft when operating in visual meteorological conditions (VMC) and as a backup to radar, which in remote areas only updates every 13 seconds, when operating under instrument flight rules (IFR).
