= Automatic Independent Surveillance – Privacy =

Automatic Independent Surveillance – Privacy (AIS-P) is a data packet protocol for the TailLight system of aircraft Traffic Collision Avoidance System (TCAS), wherein a single Mode S 64 microsecond message is transmitted by an aircraft ATCRBS or Mode S transponder, and received by aircraft and Air Traffic Control on the ground. This is an augmentation to aircraft transponders, which report aircraft position and velocity in such a way as to minimize interference with any other avionics system, maximize the possible number of participating aircraft, while not relying on any equipment on the ground, and protecting aircraft from potential attack. AIS-P and ADS-B are competing protocols for aircraft based surveillance of traffic, a replacement technology for Mode S radar and TCAS.

== AIS-P as an alternative to ADS-B ==
The TailLight, which is offered as a complimentary feature in General Aviation ATCRBS transponders like the AT-155, utilizes the AIS-P protocol to effectively deliver the advertised collision avoidance benefits of ADS-B in both airport terminal and en route airspace. It has no adverse impact on other avionics systems, can accommodate up to 335,000 aircraft within line-of-sight range of each other, and is interoperable with other collision avoidance systems while ensuring the aircraft's protection from potential attacks.

The AIS-P protocol is an alternative to the ADS-B and Mode S based TCAS protocols, and solves the problems of frequency congestion, by eliminating a requirement for multiple packet messages, or new longer packet definitions for ADS-B not established by international treaty, and by eliminating the 24 bit overhead for named identity in each packet of the message (required to tie multiple packets together into a message). One packet encodes latitude and longitude, altitude, direction, and speed (full position and velocity), handles error detection and recovery, along with channel use arbitration, in the AIS-P protocol. This reduces verbose overhead unnecessary for collision avoidance purposes.

The AIS-P protocol is not meant for purposes of billing and targeting. Additionally, one of the requirements satisfied by the AIS-P protocol is that a missile with an ADS-B type target homer aimed at the unnamed aircraft alone in the sky would miss.

== See also ==
- ADS-B
