= Self-separation =

Aircraft self-separation is the capability of an aircraft maintaining acceptably safe separation from other aircraft without following instructions or guidance from a referee agent for this purpose, such as air traffic control. In its simplest forms, it can be described by the concept of see and avoid, in the case of human-piloted aircraft, or sense and avoid, in the case of non-human piloted aircraft (such as UAVs). However, because of several factors such as weather, instrument flight rules and air traffic complexity, the self-separation capability involves other elements and aspects such as rules of the air, communication technologies and protocols, air traffic management and others.

== Context and historical background ==
Pilots of modern aircraft cannot rely only on visual abilities and piloting skills to maintain acceptably safe separation from other aircraft, thus a considerable proportion of contemporary flights are performed under instrument flight rules with the responsibility for separation belonging to air traffic control (ATC). However, as the air traffic growth in the end of the 20th century and in the beginning of the 21st is straining the ATC capacity, and pilot shortages become an ongoing issues, researchers on aviation and air transport are trying to propose operational and technological improvements in order to cope with this strain, one of which is self-separation.

Self-separation started being considered as a potentially feasible operational concept within the Free Flight initiative. Its key technological enabler is automatic dependent surveillance-broadcast (ADS-B), in which aircraft spontaneously transmit periodic position and state reports, including absolute horizontal position information, which is not used as information source for the pre-existing Traffic Collision Avoidance System (TCAS). In relation to the current implementations of TCAS, which is intended only for collision avoidance, self-separation requires a leap in processing logic, time anticipation and procedure changes. Its feasibility is dependent on confidence in automation and its co-existence with the human role in the cockpit. Some studies have been conducted to assess this relationship, and the results show that the concept is well acceptable from the pilot point of view without imposing unreasonable workload.

An aligned but less radical and more implementable approach was later proposed and named as Distributed Air-Ground Traffic Management (DAG-TM), keeping ATC still with a significant role, but allowing more freedom in en-route airspace. Besides, other relevant aspects in a wider context have been studied in the Mediterranean Free Flight project (MFF) which had, as one of the main conclusions, that self-separation would be overall beneficial, but it should have to be limited to low- or medium-density airspace.

Since the beginning of the association between self-separation and ADS-B, it has been also associated with another technical concept called Airborne Separation Assistance System (ASAS) which, in short words, performs the core logic of Self-separation and other related applications. With this association, the concept of aircraft Self-separation in the full technological and operational context is more clearly distinguishable from the already cited see and avoid and sense and avoid basic concepts. ASAS was an assumption in the MFF project and also in subsequent studies such as the series from Consiglio et al., which went deeper in the human factor aspects and set the foundations for separating strategic and tactical conflict management processes in self-separation.

Other projects provided complementary contributions, such as the Advanced Safe Separation Technologies and Algorithms (ASSTAR), which carried out performance, safety and cost-benefit analyses for ASAS applications, including a limited version of Self-separation, resulting in positive findings. Based on the above-mentioned and other studies, ASAS-based self-separation has been selected as one of the goals to be pursued by major development programs in air traffic management, such as Single European Sky ATM Research & Development (SESAR) and the U.S. Next Generation Air Transportation System (NextGen), even if limited to certain conditions and airspaces.

== Recent developments ==
More recently, the iFly project defined a new concept of operations of self-separation in higher density airspace, based on the works described above, and evaluated it quantitatively using advanced stochastic simulation methods. The results obtained from these studies indicate that self-separation can be safely used in an airspace with thrice the density of European en-route airspace as of in the year of 2005, if the ADS-B dependability level improves by a factor of five or if the TCAS dependability improves by the same factor.

== Outstanding issues ==
Some of the most relevant issues to be solved for Self-separation are:

- How to safely transition from controlled airspace to self-separation airspace?
- What is the right balance between trajectory predictability and flexibility in order to achieve practical efficiency and acceptable safety?

Although these topics have been researched and there are some solutions proposed for them, the complexity of the problem have prevented to achieve definitive responses.
