= Visual meteorological conditions =

Flight category allowing pilots to fly using vision as well as instruments

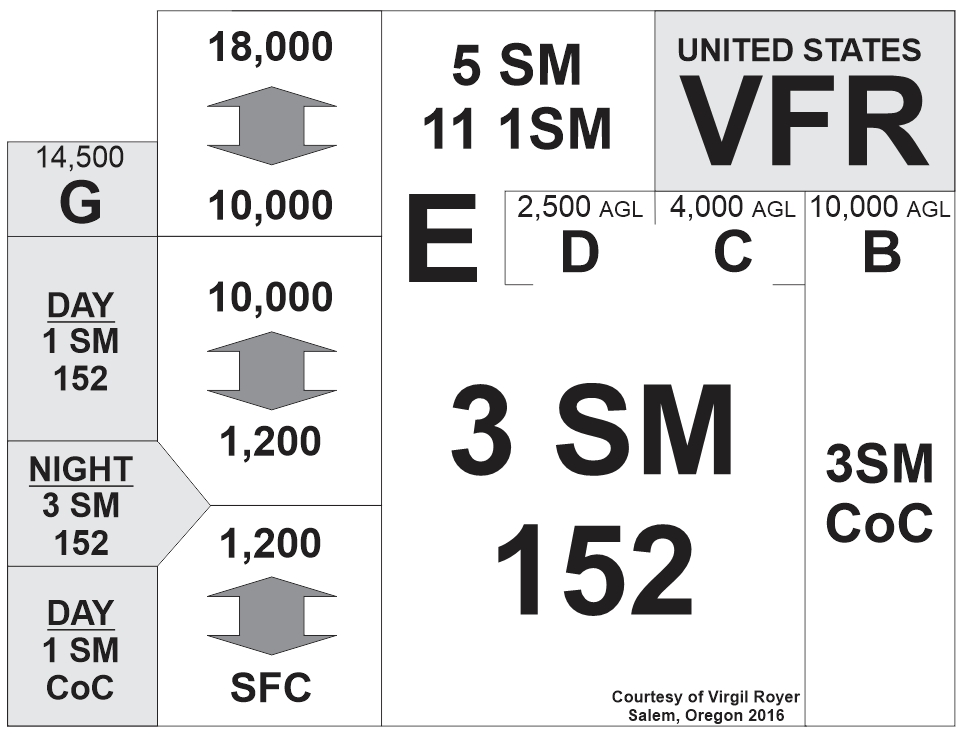
VFR / VMC visibility requirements in the US

In aviation, visual meteorological conditions (VMC) is an aviation flight category in which visual flight rules (VFR) flight is permitted—that is, conditions in which pilots have sufficient visibility to fly the aircraft maintaining visual separation from terrain and other aircraft. They are the opposite of instrument meteorological conditions (IMC). The boundary criteria between IMC and VMC are known as the VMC minima and are defined by: visibility, cloud ceilings (for takeoffs and landings), and cloud clearances.

The exact requirements vary by type of airspace, whether it is day or night (for countries that permit night VFR), and from country to country. Typical visibility requirements vary from one statute mile to five statute miles (many countries define these in metric units as 1,500 m to 8 km). Typical cloud clearance requirements vary from merely remaining clear of clouds to remaining at least one mile away (1,500 m in some countries) from clouds horizontally and 1,000 feet away from clouds vertically. For instance, in Australia, VMC minima outside controlled airspace are clear of cloud with 5,000 m visibility below 3,000 ft AMSL or 1,000 ft AGL (whichever is higher), and 1,000 ft vertical/1,500 m horizontal separation from cloud above these altitudes or in controlled airspace. Above 10,000 ft, 8,000 m visibility is required to maintain VMC. Air traffic control may also issue a "special VFR" clearance to VFR aircraft, to allow departure from a control zone in less than VMC – this reduces the visibility minimum to 1,600 m.

Generally, VMC requires greater visibility and cloud clearance in controlled airspace than in uncontrolled airspace. In uncontrolled airspace there is less risk of a VFR aircraft colliding with an instrument flight rules (IFR) aircraft emerging from a cloud, so aircraft are permitted to fly closer to clouds. An exception to this rule is class B airspace, in which ATC separates VFR traffic from all other traffic (VFR or IFR), which is why in class B airspace lower cloud clearance is permitted.

== European and UK VFR minima ==
The following minima apply in Europe and the UK.

=== Uncontrolled airspace (class F & G) ===
At and above FL 100:

8 km flight visibility, 1500 m horizontally from cloud, 1000 ft (300m) vertically from cloud

Below FL 100:

5 km flight visibility, 1500 m horizontally from cloud, 1000 ft (300m) vertically from cloud

At or below 3,000 ft:

5 km flight visibility, clear of cloud and in sight of the surface
or, for an aircraft, other than a helicopter, operating at 140 kt or less:

1,500 m flight visibility, clear of cloud and in sight of the surface

For helicopters:

Clear of cloud and in sight of the surface at a speed which is commensurate with the visibility.

=== Controlled airspace (classes C to E) By Day ===
At and above FL 100:

8 km flight visibility, 1,500 m horizontally from cloud, 1,000 ft (300m) vertically from cloud

Below FL 100:

5 km flight visibility, 1,500 m horizontally from cloud, 1,000 ft (300m) vertically from cloud

Alternatively at or below 3,000 and operating at 140kt or less ft:

For helicopters:

Clear of cloud and in sight of surface with a flight visibility of 1500m

=== Controlled airspace (classes C to E) By Night ===
At and above FL 100:

8 km flight visibility, 1,500 m horizontally from cloud, 1,000 ft (300m) vertically from cloud

Below FL 100:

5 km flight visibility, 1,500 m horizontally from cloud, 1,000 ft (300m) vertically from cloud

== Canada VFR minima ==
=== Uncontrolled Airspace (class G) ===
==== Surface to 1000 feet AGL ====
Day: Clear of Cloud. 2 statute miles for fixed wing, 1 statute mile for helicopter

Night: Clear of Cloud. 3 statute miles visibility.

==== Above 1000 feet AGL ====
Day: 2000 feet horizontally, 500 feet vertically from cloud. 1 statute mile visibility

Night: 2000 feet horizontally, 500 feet vertically from cloud. 3 statute miles visibility

=== Controlled Airspace (any class B, C, D, E) ===
1 mile horizontally, 500 feet vertically from cloud. 3 statute miles visibility.

=== Control Zones (can consist of B thru E) ===
Maintain at least 500 feet AGL except when taking off or landing.

=== Class A airspace ===
VFR flight prohibited in Class A airspace.

== US VFR minima ==
United States Visual Flight Rules are provided in Title 14 of the Code of Federal Regulations, Part 91, Section 155:

United States requirements for Visual Flight Rules (Note: Rules for helicopters/rotorcraft noted as exceptions.)
Airspace class	Time	Altitude					
Airspace class	Time	Surface to 1200 feet AGL (Note: Except as provided for in §91.155, paragraph (b).)		1200 feet AGL to 10,000 feet MSL		1200 feet AGL and above 10,000 feet MSL	
Airspace class	Time	Visibility (Note: In statute miles (SM))	Clearance from clouds (Note: In feet, unless otherwise noted)	Visibility	Clearance from clouds	Visibility	Clearance from clouds
G	Day	1 (Note: For helicopters: 1/2 SM)	clear of clouds (Note: For helicopters: clear of clouds)	1	500 below, 1000 above, 2000 horizontally	5	1000 below, 1000 above, 1 SM horizontally
G	Night	3 (Note: For helicopters: 1 SM)	500 below, 1000 above, 2000 horizontally	3	500 below, 1000 above, 2000 horizontally	5	1000 below, 1000 above, 1 SM horizontally
Airspace class	Time	Altitude					
Airspace class	Time	Below 10,000 feet MSL			At or above 10,000 feet MSL		
Airspace class	Time	Visibility		Clearance from clouds	Visibility		Clearance from clouds
E	Day or night	3		500 below, 1000 above, 2000 horizontally	5		1000 below, 1000 above, 1 SM horizontally
Airspace class	Time	Any altitude					
Airspace class	Time	Visibility			Clearance from clouds		
D	Day or night	3			500 below, 1000 above, 2000 horizontally		
C	Day or night	3			500 below, 1000 above, 2000 horizontally		
B	Day or night	3			Clear of clouds		
A	Day or night	Prohibited (Note: Exception for emergency NORDO operations. Pilots in Class A airspace must be instrument rated, operating with an IFR flight plan, and aircraft must be equipped with 2-way radios, a Mode-C Transponder, and ADS-B out.)					

== See also ==
- List of meteorology topics
- Airspace class (United States)
