= Free flight (air traffic control) =

Free flight is a developing air traffic control method that uses no centralized control (e.g. air traffic controllers). Instead, parts of airspace are reserved dynamically and automatically in a distributed way using computer communication to ensure the required separation between aircraft. This new system may be implemented into the U.S. air traffic control system in the next decade. Its potential impact on the operations of the national airspace system is disputed, however.

== Overview ==
Free flight is a new concept being developed to take the place of the current air traffic management methods through the use of technology. True free flight eliminates the need for air traffic control (ATC) operators by giving the responsibility to the pilot in command. This gives the pilot the ability to change trajectory in mid-flight. With the aid of computer systems and/or ATC, pilots will be able to make more flight path decisions independently. As in most complex systems, distributed yet cooperative decision making is believed to be more efficient than the centralized control characterized by the current mode of air traffic management.

== History ==
Free flight began as an effort to become less dependent on the human factor and more dependent on the growing technology of its day. As airlines expanded their fleets in the 1960s, they increased the need for air traffic management (ATM). ATM created instrument flight rules (commonly known as "IFR") to manage the growing numbers of aircraft. This helped control air traffic, but required a significant amount of time, effort, and resources to maintain IFR flight.

In 1968, the Federal Aviation Administration issued the High Density Airport Rule to reduce the number of aircraft in a given airport. Twenty years earlier Crocker Snow used television cameras to locate his position when flying an aircraft. He sent up signals to the aircraft so they could get a third person perspective of the aircraft's surrounding. This idea worked but was too costly and was impractical. In the 1960s transponders removed the need to use television cameras.

Other problems that occurred in the air traffic industry were the OPEC fuel crises and the Professional Air Traffic Controllers Organization (PATCO) strike of 1982 resulting in the firing of thousands of controllers by President Ronald Reagan. This showed how vulnerable air transportation was to economic forces.

The key components of free flight were identified in 1971 by United Airlines systems manager William Cotton, although the technology to implement it was not available for another two decades.

In the 1970's the GPS satellite navigation system was deployed by the US Department of Defense and the aviation industry saw the opportunity to use GPS for potentially more efficient air traffic management capabilities through an increased use of this capability coupled with automation enabled by it.

In 1991 the International Civil Aviation Organization created the Future Air Navigation System Panel. The panel produced descriptions of satellite-based technology applications and their use in air traffic management. A larger role emerged for "user-defined trajectory" that became known as "free flight" by the mid-1990s.

The first hearings on implementing free flight were held in August 1994 by Representative Collin Peterson (D-Minnesota), chair of the House subcommittee with investigative jurisdiction over the FAA.

In 1995 David Hinson, the FAA administrator, organized a task force to draw up detailed plans to implement free flight. The report, issued in October that year called for three phases; phase I ended at the end of 2002, the others have not been started. A method and system for an automated tool to enable en route traffic controllers to optimize aircraft routes dynamically was patented by the NASA in 2001.

True free flight applications exist only on a small scale in selected airspace operations where only the most well equipped aircraft operate, such as at high altitude by commercial airliners. There are many versions of free flight being conceived for the Next Generation Air Transportation System (NGATS). The free flight vision is expected to slowly emerge over the next 20–30 years as NGATS emerges from billions of dollars of development, testing, careful transition planning, training, and deployment of ground-based and airborne systems by all types of aircraft. Key elements of NGATS include the automatic dependent surveillance-broadcast (ADS-B) and what can be expected to be an ever-evolving, net-centric information application called the System Wide Information Management System or "SWIM".

== Regions ==
The regions are broken up into unrestricted, transition, and restricted.

Unrestricted
In the unrestricted region there will be very little guidance from ATC since aircraft density will be low. Pilots will have a great deal of flexibility to exercise free flight in this area. However, it may become complicated when bad weather is calculated into the equation. Pilots may have to adjust their course to avoid inclement weather. In doing so other pilots attempting to avoid the conditions may cross path with each other. ATC will have to assist the pilots and guide them through this issue.

Transition
Slightly restricted however pilots retain some flexibility to exercise free flight.

Restricted
The freedom of the pilot has been restricted significantly.

== Approaches of free flight ==
There are several approaches that free flight can move towards.

=== Airborne ===
In the airborne approach, the separation responsibility is entirely with the pilots, operating under self separation conditions. The pilot is responsible for detecting and resolving problems while in flight. Computers will help aid the aircrew in this matter. Information, such as weather reports or other aircraft position, is forwarded from ATC (or automated stations) to the aircraft so the pilots can decide the best course of action to take. The surveillance system can either be on the ground or on board the aircraft.

Problems with this method include complete surveillance information assurance, communication with different equipment, smaller aircraft incapable of carrying the equipment, and the possibility of a system malfunctioning. It is extremely difficult to have total assurance of all air traffic. If two aircraft flying with different equipment encounter each other, the equipment's data will have to be sent to the receiving equipment as well as the normal information such as speed. Larger planes will have no problems with the equipment, but smaller aircraft will have problems communicating to each other if it lacks an essential component. Surely, if this was a one-on-one scenario, it would be easy to solve, but if multiple aircraft were involved, the difficulty of finding a solution compounds. Lastly, if a system fails or the software has a computer programming error, the aircraft and other aircraft will be flying blind.

=== Ground ===
All of the data are sent to ATC and pilot requests a particular flight path. Communication will be from aircraft to ATC instead of aircraft to aircraft.

In this approach the aircrew will not have the full situational awareness experience in the airborne approach. Aircrew will not be able to handle uncertainties or help out with the uncertainties in this approach. If one aircraft does not follow the directive ATC issues, the directive will have to be reissued and in turn increase the workload of ATM operators.

=== Mixed focus ===
Mixed focus approach which is a combination of both the airborne and ground approach. AOC initially sends route to aircraft and ATM. If the aircrew does not like the route, it sends the route changes to ATM and AOC.

== Separation ==
Aircraft separation is divided up into the protected zone and the alert zone. In the larger zone, called the alert zone, the system informs the aircraft through one of the three approaches that an aircraft is in the vicinity. It acts as a flag and merely alerts the aircrew. In the protected zone, the area must remain sterile of all foreign objects. It is the minimum distance anything can approach. The system should alert the aircrew before anything comes close to it, but if it manages to enter the protected zone, aircrew will take evasive maneuver to avoid a collision.

== Conflict and detection method using center-TRACON automation system ==
Center-TRACON automation system (CTAS) receives data from aircraft trajectory, atmospheric model, aircraft performance, and other contributing factors. Based on the information it receives it will calculate the best trajectory though equations and logic. CTAS is currently being used on a small scale.

== See also ==
- Next Generation Air Transportation System
- ADS-B
- TCAS
- GPS
- System Wide Information Management
- Small Aircraft Transportation System
- Self Separation (aircraft)
- SESAR
