= Automatic Dependent Surveillance–Broadcast =

Aircraft surveillance technology

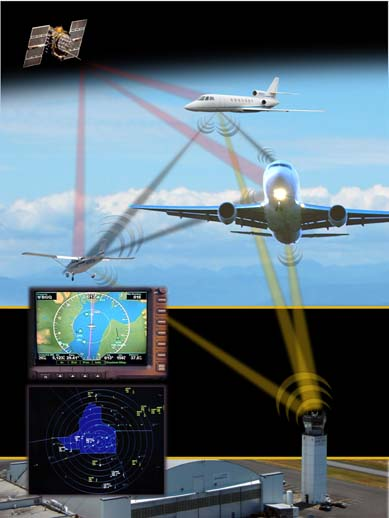
Conceptual of the ADS-B system, illustrating radio links between aircraft, ground station and satellite

Automatic Dependent Surveillance–Broadcast (ADS-B) is an aviation surveillance technology and form of electronic conspicuity in which an aircraft determines its position via satellite navigation or other sensors and periodically broadcasts its position and other related data, enabling it to be tracked. The information can be received by ground-based - including air traffic control - or satellite-based receivers as a replacement for secondary surveillance radar (SSR). Unlike SSR, ADS-B does not require an interrogation signal from the ground or from other aircraft to activate its transmissions. ADS-B can also receive point-to-point by other nearby ADS-B equipped aircraft to provide traffic situational awareness and support self-separation.

ADS-B is "automatic" in that it requires no pilot or external input to trigger its transmissions. It is "dependent" in that it depends on data from the aircraft's navigation system to provide the transmitted data.

ADS-B is a key part of the International Civil Aviation Organization's (ICAO) approved aviation surveillance technologies and is being progressively incorporated into national airspaces worldwide. For example, it is an element of the United States Next Generation Air Transportation System (NextGen), the Single European Sky ATM Research project (SESAR), and India's Aviation System Block Upgrade (ASBU). ADS-B equipment is mandatory for instrument flight rules (IFR) category aircraft in Australian airspace; the United States has required many aircraft (including all commercial passenger carriers and aircraft flying in areas that required an SSR transponder) to be so equipped since January 2020; and, the equipment has been mandatory for some aircraft in Europe since 2017. Canada uses ADS-B for surveillance in remote regions not covered by traditional radar (areas around Hudson Bay, the Labrador Sea, Davis Strait, Baffin Bay and southern Greenland) since 15 January 2009. Aircraft operators are encouraged to install ADS-B products that are interoperable with US and European standards, and Canadian air traffic controllers can provide better and more fuel-efficient flight routes when operators can be tracked via ADS-B.

== Description ==
ADS-B is an airspace surveillance system which could eventually replace secondary surveillance radar as the main surveillance method for controlling aircraft worldwide. In the United States ADS-B is an integral component of the NextGen national airspace strategy for upgrading and enhancing aviation infrastructure and operations.

ADS-B enhances safety by making an aircraft visible, in realtime, to air traffic control (ATC) and to other ADS-B In equipped aircraft, with position and velocity data transmitted every second. FAA program descriptions state that ADS-B Out broadcasts position and other data (such as altitude and ground speed) once per second to ground stations and other aircraft, and note that U.S. airspace and equipment-performance requirements are specified in 14 CFR §§ 91.225 and 91.227. Other uses of ADS-B data include post-flight analysis, inexpensive flight tracking, planning, and dispatch.

Within the United States, the ADS-B system has the ability to provide air traffic and government-generated graphical weather information at no cost through TIS-B and FIS-B applications.

ADS-B consists of two distinct functions - "ADS-B Out" and "ADS-B In". Each "ADS-B Out" aircraft periodically broadcasts information about itself, such as identification, current position, altitude and velocity through an onboard transmitter. ADS-B Out provides air traffic controllers with real-time aircraft position information that is, in most cases, more accurate than the information available with current radar-based systems. With more accurate information, ATC can manage and separate aircraft with improved precision and timing.

"ADS-B In" is the reception and processing of transmitted ADS-B information (i.e., "ADS-B Out") by other aircraft. In the US ADS-B In can also include other information for pilots transmitted from ATC ground stations such as FIS-B and TIS-B data. These ground station data broadcasts are typically made available only when an ADS-B Out broadcasting aircraft is nearby.

The ADS-B Out system relies on two avionics components aboard each aircraft: a high-integrity satellite navigation source (i.e. GPS or other certified GNSS receiver) and a datalink (the ADS-B unit). There are several types of certified ADS-B data links, but the most common ones operate at 1090 MHz, essentially a modified Mode S transponder, or at 978 MHz. The FAA would like to see aircraft that operate exclusively below 18,000 feet (5,500 m) use the 978 MHz link, as this will alleviate congestion of the 1090 MHz frequency. To obtain ADS-B Out capability at 1090 MHz, user-operators can install a new transponder or modify an existing transponder if the manufacturer offers an ADS-B upgrade (plus install a certified GNSS position source if one is not already present). Although ADS-B In is generally not required for operations in U.S. airspace, the FAA has continued developing advanced operational applications that use cockpit traffic displays and aircraft spacing guidance. These include Interval Management and Cockpit Display of Traffic Information (CDTI)-assisted operations, which support more precise aircraft spacing and improved flight-deck situational awareness. The FAA has published operational guidance and technical standards for these applications as part of NextGen modernization efforts.

== Benefits ==
ADS-B provides many benefits to both pilots and air traffic control that improve both the safety and efficiency of flight.

When using an ADS-B In system, a pilot is able to view traffic information about surrounding aircraft if those aircraft are equipped with ADS-B Out. This information includes altitude, heading, speed, and distance to the aircraft. In addition to receiving position reports from ADS-B Out participants, in the US, TIS-B can provide position reports on non-ADS-B Out-equipped aircraft if suitable ground equipment and ground radar exist. ADS-R re-transmits ADS-B position reports between UAT and 1090 MHz frequency bands.

Aircraft equipped with universal access transceiver (UAT) ADS-B In technology will be able to receive weather reports, and in the US, weather radar through flight information service-broadcast (FIS-B), which also transmits readable flight information such as temporary flight restrictions (TFRs) and NOTAMs.

ADS-B ground stations are significantly cheaper to install and operate compared to primary and secondary radar systems used by air traffic control for aircraft separation and control.

Unlike some alternative in-flight weather services currently being offered commercially, there will be no subscription fees to use ADS-B services or its various benefits in the US. The aircraft owner will pay for the equipment and installation, while the Federal Aviation Administration (FAA) will pay for administering and broadcasting all the services related to the technology.

=== Safety ===
==== Situational awareness ====
ADS-B makes flying significantly safer for the aviation community by providing pilots with improved situational awareness. Pilots in an ADS-B In equipped cockpit will have the ability to see, on their in-cockpit flight display, other traffic operating in the airspace and have access to clear and detailed weather information. They will also be able to receive pertinent updates ranging from temporary flight restrictions to runway closings.

==== Improved visibility ====
Even aircraft only equipped with ADS-B Out will benefit from air traffic controllers' ability to more accurately and reliably monitor their position. When using this system both pilots and controllers will see the same radar picture. Other fully equipped aircraft using the airspace around them will be able to more easily identify and avoid conflict with an aircraft equipped with ADS-B Out. With past systems such as the Traffic alert and Collision Avoidance System (TCAS) aircraft could only see other aircraft equipped with the same technology. With ADS-B, information is sent to aircraft using ADS-B In, which displays all aircraft in the area, provided those aircraft are equipped with ADS-B Out. ADS-B provides better surveillance in fringe areas of radar coverage. ADS-B does not have the siting limitations of radar. Its accuracy is consistent throughout the range. In both forms of ADS-B (1090ES & 978 MHz UAT), the position report is updated once per second. The 978 MHz UAT provides the information in a single, short-duration transmission. The 1090ES system transmits two different kinds of position reports (even/odd) randomly. To decode the position unambiguously, one position report of both kinds or a reference position nearby is needed.

ADS-B enables improved safety by providing:

- Radar-like IFR separation in non-radar airspace
- Increased VFR flight following coverage
- ATC final approach and runway occupancy, reducing runway incursions on the ground
- More accurate search and rescue response: ADS-B was demonstrated to the Civil Air Patrol (CAP) in March 2003 by AOPA via flight demonstrations for possible integration of the technology in CAP activities.
- Helps pilots to see and avoid other aircraft
- Cockpit final approach and runway occupancy
- Visual separation in VFR and MVFR conditions
- VFR-like separation in all weather conditions
- Real-time cockpit weather display
- Real-time cockpit airspace display

Since implementation of the FAA's ADS-B Out equipage requirement on January 1, 2020, ADS-B has become the FAA's preferred surveillance technology for most controlled U.S. airspace and a key component of the NextGen System. The FAA also continues to expand operational applications for ADS-B In, including cockpit traffic displays, weather information, and advanced flight-deck procedures such as CDTI Assisted Visual Separation (CAVS) and In-Trail Procedures (ITP), which use ADS-B data to improve pilot situational awareness and operational efficiency.

=== Efficiency ===
==== Reduced environmental impact ====
ADS-B technology provides a more accurate report of an aircraft's position. This allows controllers to guide aircraft into and out of crowded airspace with smaller separation standards than it was previously possible to do safely. This reduces the amount of time aircraft must spend waiting for clearances, and being vectored for spacing and holding. Estimates show that this is already having a beneficial impact by reducing pollution and fuel consumption.

==== Traffic capacity improvement ====
ADS-B enables increased capacity and efficiency by supporting:

- Better ATC traffic flow management
- Merging and spacing
- Self-separation or station keeping
- Enhanced visual approaches;
- Closely spaced parallel approaches;
- Reduced spacing on final approach;
- Reduced aircraft separations;
- Enhanced operations in high altitude airspace for the incremental evolution of the "free flight" concept;
- Surface operations in lower visibility conditions;
- Near visual meteorological conditions (VMC) capacities throughout the airspace in most weather conditions;
- Improved air traffic control services in non-radar airspace;
- Trajectory-based operations provide a gently ascending and descending gradient with no step-downs or holding patterns needed. This will produce optimal trajectories with each aircraft becoming one node within a system-wide information management network connecting all equipped parties in the air and on the ground. With all parties equipped with NextGen equipment, benefits will include reduced gate-to-gate travel times, increased runway utilization capacity, and increased efficiency with carbon conservation.

=== Other applications ===
The ADS-B data link supports a number of airborne and ground applications.

==== Cockpit display of traffic information ====
A cockpit display of traffic information (CDTI) is a generic display that provides the flight crew with surveillance information about other aircraft, including their position. Traffic information for a CDTI may be obtained from one or multiple sources, including ADS-B, TCAS, and TIS-B.

In addition to traffic based on ADS-B reports, a CDTI function might also display current weather conditions, terrain, airspace structure, obstructions, detailed airport maps, and other information relevant to the particular phase of flight.

==== Airborne collision avoidance ====
ADS-B is seen as a valuable technology to enhance airborne collision avoidance system (ACAS) operation.

Eventually, the ACAS function may be provided based solely on ADS-B, without requiring active interrogations of other aircraft transponders.

Other applications that may benefit from ADS-B include:

- Lighting control automation and operation
- Airport ground vehicle and aircraft rescue and firefighting vehicle operational needs
- Altitude height keeping performance measurements
- General aviation operations control
- Conflict management
- ATS conformance monitoring
- Aircraft spotting where personal receivers can be used to produce a virtual radar picture
- A number of websites use crowd-sourced distributed networks of ADS-B receivers to track air traffic.

== Security risk ==
Aircraft with transponder only, or no transponder capability at all will not be shown. Pilots who become complacent or overconfident in this system are thus a safety problem, not only for themselves but for other transponder-only aircraft, and glider aircraft without ADS-B transponder.

Glider aircraft often use the FLARM system for collision avoidance with other glider aircraft, but this system is not compatible with ADS-B. Aircraft with ADS-B but without FLARM are thus a safety risk for gliders with FLARM but without ADS-B and vice versa. Some aircraft, like those used for towing gliders, have both FLARM and ADS-B transponders for this reason.

A security researcher claimed in 2012 that ADS-B has no defence against being interfered with via spoofed ADS-B messages because they were neither encrypted nor authenticated. The FAA responded to this criticism saying that they were aware of the issues and risks but were unable to disclose how they are mitigated as that is classified. A possible mitigation is multilateration to verify that the claimed position is close to the position from which the message was broadcast. Here the timing of received messages is compared to establish distances from the antenna to the plane.

The lack of any authentication within the standard makes it mandatory to validate any received data by use of the primary radar. Because the content of ADS-B messages is not encrypted, it may be read by anybody.

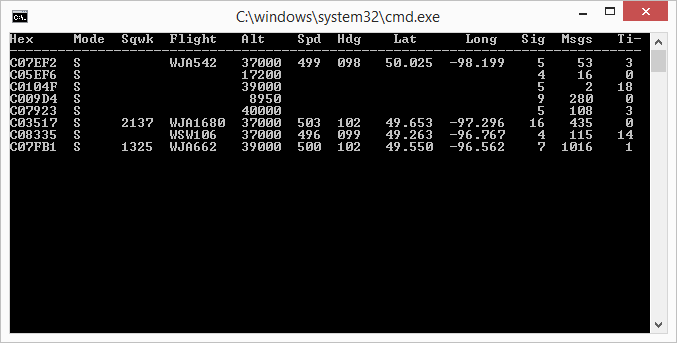
An example of the reception of ADS-B signals on a software-defined radio dongle. These signals are not encrypted. Inexpensive hardware and free software can be used to display the speed, course, altitude, callsign and identification of an aircraft equipped with an ADS-B transponder.

== Theory of operation ==
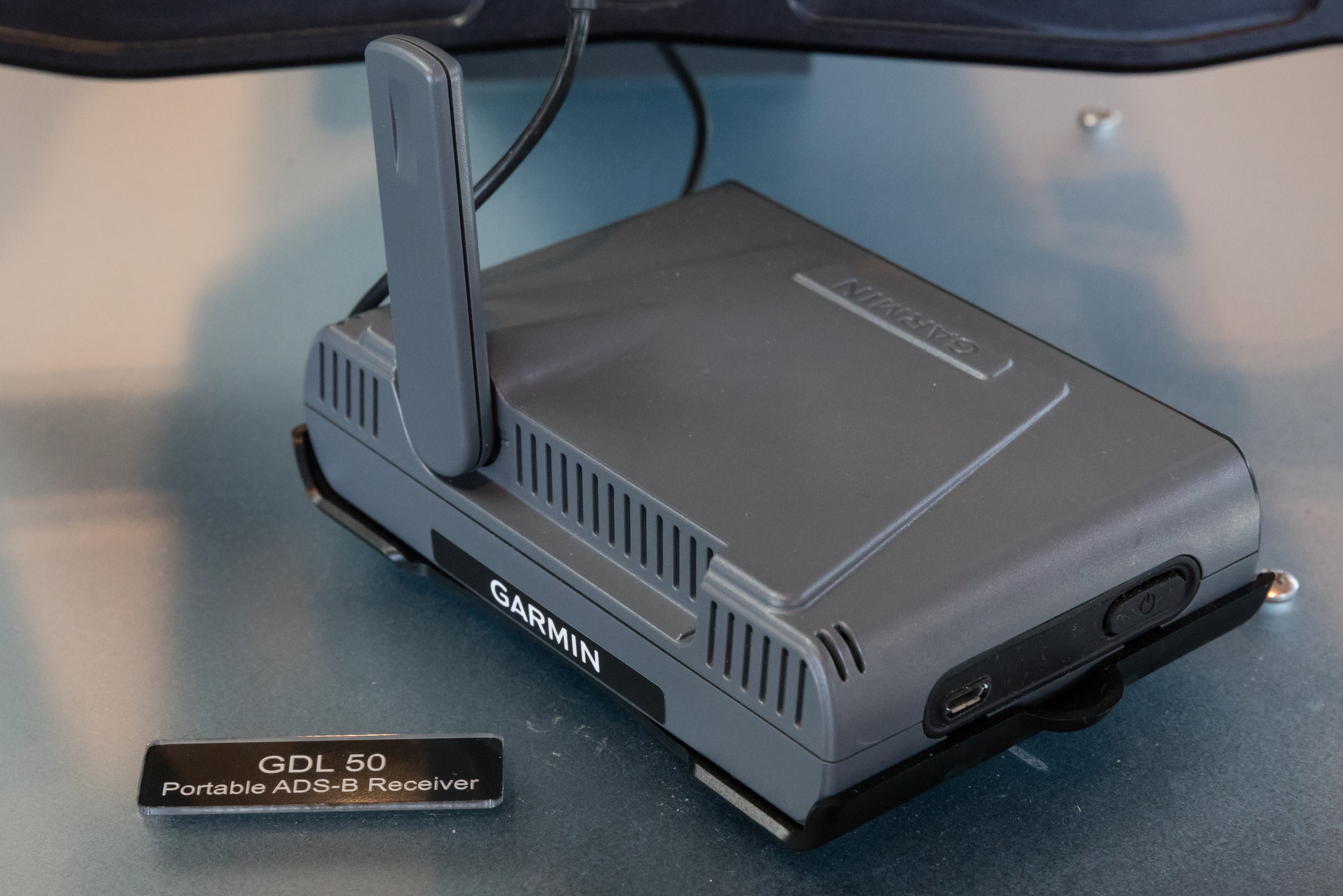
A portable ADS-B receiver

The ADS-B system has three main components: 1) ground infrastructure, 2) airborne component, and 3) operating procedures.

The source of the state vector and other transmitted information as well as user applications are not considered to be part of the ADS-B system.

=== Physical layer ===
Two link solutions are used as the physical layer for relaying ADS-B position reports: universal access transceiver, and 1090 MHz extended squitter.

==== Universal Access Transceiver (UAT) ====
A universal access transceiver is a data link on the frequency 978 MHz. UAT is intended to serve the majority of the general aviation community in the United States. The data link is approved in the Federal Aviation Administration's "final rule" for use in all airspace except class A (above 18,000 ft. MSL). UAT is intended to support not only ADS-B, but also flight information service – broadcast (FIS-B), traffic information service – broadcast (TIS-B), and, if required in the future, supplementary ranging and positioning capabilities. Due to the set of standards required for this rule, it is seen as the most effective application for general aviation users. UAT will allow aircraft equipped with "out" broadcast capabilities to be seen by any other aircraft using ADS-B In technology as well as by FAA ground stations. Aircraft equipped with ADS-B In technology will be able to see detailed altitude and vector information from other ADS-B Out equipped aircraft as well as FIS-B and TIS-B broadcasts. The FIS-B broadcast will allow receiving aircraft to view weather and flight service information including AIRMETs, SIGMETs, METARs, SPECI, national NEXRAD, regional NEXRAD, D-NOTAMs, FDC-NOTAMs, PIREPs, special use airspace status, terminal area forecasts, amended terminal aerodrome forecasts (TAFs), and winds and temperatures aloft forecasts. These broadcasts serve to provide early adopters of the technology with benefits as an incentive for more pilots to use the technology before 2020. Aircraft receiving traffic information through the TIS-B service will see other aircraft in a manner that is similar to how all aircraft will be seen after they have been equipped by 2020. The availability of a non-subscription weather information service, FIS-B, provides general aviation users with a useful alternative to other monthly or annual fee-based services.

The UAT system is specifically designed for ADS-B operation. UAT is also the first link to be certified for "radar-like" ATC services in the United States. Since 2001 it has been providing 5 nmi (9.3 km; 5.8 mi) en-route separation (the same as mosaic radar but not 3 nmi (5.6 km; 3.5 mi) of single-site sensors) in Alaska. UAT is the only ADS-B link standard that is truly bidirectional: UAT users have access to ground-based aeronautical data (FIS-B) and can receive reports from proximate traffic (TIS-B) through a multilink gateway service that provides ADS-B reports for 1090ES-equipped aircraft and non-ADS-B equipped radar traffic. UAT-equipped aircraft can also observe each other directly with high accuracy and minimal latency. Viable ADS-B UAT networks are being installed as part of the United States' NextGen air traffic system.

==== 1090 MHz extended squitter ====
In 2002 the Federal Aviation Administration (FAA) announced a dual-link decision using the 1090 MHz extended squitter (1090 ES) link for air carrier and private or commercial operators of high-performance aircraft, and universal access transceiver link for the typical general aviation user. In November 2012, the European Aviation Safety Agency confirmed that the European Union would also use 1090 ES for interoperability. The format of extended squitter messages has been codified by the ICAO.

With 1090 ES, the existing Mode S transponder (TSO C-112 or a standalone 1090 MHz transmitter) supports a message type known as the extended squitter message. It is a periodic message that provides position, velocity, time, and, in the future, intent. The basic ES does not offer intent since current flight management systems do not provide such data (called trajectory change points). To enable an aircraft to send an extended squitter message, the transponder is modified (TSO C-166A) and aircraft position and other status information is routed to the transponder. ATC ground stations and aircraft equipped with traffic collision avoidance system (TCAS) already have the necessary 1090 MHz (Mode S) receivers to receive these signals, and would only require enhancements to accept and process the additional extended squitter information. As per the FAA ADS-B link decision, and the technical link standards, 1090 ES does not support FIS-B service.

=== Relationship to surveillance radar ===
Radar directly measures the range and bearing of an aircraft from a ground-based antenna. The primary surveillance radar is usually a pulse radar. It continuously transmits high-power radio frequency (RF) pulses. Bearing is measured by the position of the rotating radar antenna when it receives the RF pulses that are reflected from the aircraft skin. The range is measured by measuring the time it takes for the RF energy to travel to and from the aircraft.

Primary surveillance radar does not require any cooperation from the aircraft. It is robust in the sense that surveillance outage failure modes are limited to those associated with the ground radar system. Secondary surveillance radar depends on active replies from the aircraft. Its failure modes include the transponder aboard the aircraft. Typical ADS-B aircraft installations use the output of the navigation unit for navigation and for cooperative surveillance, introducing a common failure mode that must be accommodated in air traffic surveillance systems.

Type	Independent?	Cooperative?
Primary surveillance radar (PSR)	Yes: surveillance data derived by radar	No: does not depend on aircraft equipment
Secondary surveillance radar (SSR)	No: surveillance data provided by aircraft transponder	Yes: requires aircraft to have a working ATCRBS transponder
Automatic dependent surveillance (ADS-B)	No: surveillance data provided by aircraft	Yes: requires aircraft to have a working ADS-B function
Source: RTCA DO-242A

The radiated beam becomes wider as the distance between the antenna and the aircraft becomes greater, making the position information less accurate. Additionally, detecting changes in aircraft velocity requires several radar sweeps that are spaced several seconds apart. In contrast, a system using ADS-B creates and listens for periodic position and intent reports from aircraft. These reports are generated based on the aircraft's navigation system and distributed via one or more of the ADS-B data links. The accuracy of the data is no longer susceptible to the position of the aircraft or the length of time between radar sweeps. (However, the signal strength of the signal received from the aircraft at the ground station is still dependent on the range from the aircraft to the receiver, and interference, obstacles, or weather could degrade the integrity of the received signal enough to prevent the digital data from being decoded without errors. When the aircraft is farther away, the weaker received signal will tend to be more affected by the aforementioned adverse factors and is less likely to be received without errors. Error detection will allow errors to be recognized, so the system maintains full accuracy regardless of aircraft position when the signal can be received and decoded correctly. This advantage does not equate to a total indifference to the range of an aircraft from the ground station.)

Today's air traffic control (ATC) systems do not rely on coverage by a single radar. Instead, a multi-radar picture is presented via the ATC system's display to the controller. This improves the quality of the reported position of the aircraft, provides a measure of redundancy, and makes it possible to verify the output of the different radars against others.

=== Relationship to ADS-A/ADS-C ===
There are two commonly recognized types of ADS for aircraft applications:

- ADS-addressed (ADS-A), also known as ADS-Contract (ADS-C)
- ADS-broadcast (ADS-B)

ADS-A is based on a negotiated one-to-one peer relationship between an aircraft providing ADS information and a ground facility requiring receipt of ADS messages. For example, ADS-A reports are employed in the Future Air Navigation System (FANS) using the Aircraft Communications Addressing and Reporting System (ACARS) as the communication protocol. During a flight over areas without radar coverage, e.g., oceanic and polar, reports are periodically sent by an aircraft to the controlling air traffic region.,

=== Traffic information service – broadcast (TIS–B) ===
Traffic information service – broadcast (TIS–B) supplements ADS-B's air-to-air services to provide complete situational awareness in the cockpit of all traffic known to the ATC system. TIS–B is an important service for an ADS-B link in airspace where not all aircraft are transmitting ADS-B information. The ground TIS–B station transmits surveillance target information on the ADS-B data link for unequipped targets or targets transmitting only on another ADS-B link.

TIS–B uplinks are derived from the best available ground surveillance sources:

- multilateration systems for targets on the airport surface
- ADS-B systems for targets equipped with a different ADS-B link

=== Multilink gateway service ===
The multilink gateway service is a companion to TIS-B for achieving interoperability between different aircraft equipped with 1090ES or UAT by using ground-based relay stations. These aircraft cannot directly share air-to-air ADS-B data due to the different communication frequencies. In terminal areas, where both types of ADS-B link are in use, ADS-B/TIS-B ground stations use ground-to-air broadcasts to relay ADS-B reports received on one link to aircraft using the other link.

Although multilink "solves" the issue of heavy airliners working on one frequency vs. light aircraft, the dual frequency nature of the system has several potential issues:

- Since two aircraft on two different ADS-B frequencies must use a ground station to talk to each other, this introduces the ground station as a point of failure, although to be fair, the 1090 signal is dependent on secondary radar scans in any case (and thus cannot operate without a ground station).
- The time taken to traverse the full path from one aircraft, to the ground station, then to the second aircraft adds delay to the signal. This contrasts with two autonomous ADS-B transceivers on UAT, which have a shorter and shorter delay as they converge.
- Aircraft are frequently out of the range of ground-based radar due to altitude. Radar can be blocked by mountains, and typically is not useful for coverage near an airport unless that airport has radar. Thus, approach, departure, and especially taxi/ground-based operations are compromised (a major selling point of the system).

Because of the issues with multilink, many ADS-B manufacturers are designing ADS-B systems as dual-frequency capable.

=== Flight information services-broadcast (FIS-B) ===
FIS-B provides weather text, weather graphics, NOTAMs, ATIS, and similar information. FIS-B is inherently different from ADS-B in that it requires sources of data external to the aircraft or broadcasting unit, and has different performance requirements such as periodicity of broadcast.

In the United States, FIS-B services are provided over the UAT link in areas that have a ground surveillance infrastructure.

Another potential aircraft-based broadcast capability is to transmit aircraft measurements of meteorological data.

== Implementations by country ==
=== Australia ===
Airservices Australia operates more than 70 ADS-B ground receiver sites and Australia has full continental ADS-B coverage above FL300 (30,000 feet). ADS-B equipment is mandatory for all aircraft flying at or above this altitude. ADS-B equipment is also mandatory for all IFR aircraft at any altitude. This applies to all Australian registered aircraft.

=== Canada ===
Nav Canada commissioned operational use of ADS-B in 2009 and is now using it to provide coverage of its northern airspace around Hudson Bay, which previously had almost no radar coverage. The service was then extended to cover some oceanic areas off the east coast of Canada including the Labrador Sea, Davis Strait, Baffin Bay, and part of the North Atlantic Tracks around southern Greenland. The service was later extended to cover the Canadian Arctic, and to the rest of Canada.

In 2018, Nav Canada issued an aeronautical study proposing a mandate for Aireon-compatible ADS-B Out for all aircraft in Class A Airspace by 2021 and Class B Airspace, to be completed by 2022, requiring a transponder capable of delivering antenna diversity performance. In response to stakeholder feedback, Nav Canada later announced that such equipment will not be mandated according to that timeline, but rather that suitably equipped aircraft would be handled on a priority basis. The dates upon which equipment are required for operation in Canadian airspace were announced to be 10 August 2023 for Class A Airspace, 16 May 2024 for Class B Airspace, and no sooner than 2026 for Class C, D, and E Airspace.

In May 2021, the not-for-profit Canadian In-Flight Information Broadcasting Association (CIFIB) announced its intention to build and operate a network broadcasting FIS-B (Flight Information Services - Broadcast)(weather) and TIS-B (Traffic Information Services - Broadcast)(traffic) information on 978 MHz UAT. By spring 2022, five ground stations were operating in Ontario, and more are currently being built, with the goal of the network covering areas with higher traffic. As of 2025, twelve stations operate in four provinces. The Canadian network is fully compatible with the United States network, and aircraft can use the same UAT (ADS-B In) receivers in both countries and the provided services operate seamlessly when crossing the border.

=== China ===
An American company ADS-B Technologies created one of the largest and most successful ADS-B systems in the world (an eight-station, 350+ aircraft network that spans more than 1,200 NM across Central China). This was also the first UAT installation outside the United States. As of March 2009, more than 1.2 million incident/failure-free flight hours had been flown with these ADS-B systems.

In 2024, the Ministry of State Security accused that ADS-B receivers deployed by foreign organizations constitute a national security risk. Authorities had mounted clampdowns on enthusiasts who installed ADS-B receivers.

=== Iceland ===
As of 2010, Isavia is in the process of installing ADS-B across the North Atlantic Ocean. The system is made up by 18 ADS-B receiver stations in Iceland, Faroe Islands, and Greenland.

=== India ===
The Airports Authority of India (AAI), which manages the country's airspace, first commissioned German company Comsoft to install ADS-B ground stations at 14 airport sites nationwide in 2012. Comsoft finished installing seven new ADS-B ground stations under a second phase of deployment which India subsequently integrated into its ATC system in 2014, thus completing its ground network for automatic dependent surveillance-broadcast (ADS-B) tracking of aircraft.

In line with the International Civil Aviation Organization's aviation system block upgrade plan, AAI has said that its ADS-B network will provide redundant, satellite-based surveillance where radar coverage exists, fill gaps in surveillance where radar coverage is not possible due to high terrain or remote airspace and enable it to share ADS-B data with neighboring countries. The network covers the Indian subcontinent, plus parts of the Bay of Bengal and the Arabian Sea.

=== Sweden ===
LFV Group in Sweden has implemented a nationwide ADS-B network with 12 ground stations. Installation commenced during the spring of 2006, and the network was fully (technically) operational in 2007. An ADS-B–supported system was opened in Spring 2009, and is currently operational in Kiruna, Sweden. Based on the VDL Mode 4 standards, the network of ground stations can support services for ADS-B, TIS-B, FIS-B, GNS-B (DGNSS augmentation) and point-to-point communication, allowing aircraft equipped with VDL 4-compliant transceivers to lower fuel consumption and reduce flight times.

=== United Arab Emirates ===
United Arab Emirates commissioned three operational redundant ADS-B ground stations in early 2009 and is now using ADS-B to provide enhanced coverage of its upper airspace in combination and integrated with conventional surveillance radars.

=== United States ===
To reduce congestion and cope with growing aircraft traffic, the Federal Aviation Administration has been developing the Next-Generation Air Transportation System (NextGen), including ADS-B. ADS-B equipment is built to meet one of two sets of industry standards, DO-260B and DO-282B.

Aircraft operating in the United States in the airspace classes listed below are required to carry equipment that produces an ADS-B Out broadcast.Since the FAA’s January 1, 2020 compliance date for the ADS-B Out rule, this technology has become the primary surveillance source for most controlled U.S. airspace and a main component of the Next Generation Air Transportation System (NextGen). Air traffic controllers routinely use ADS-B data for aircraft surveillance and separation. Many operators also use ADS-B data for flight tracking, operational monitoring, and post-flight analysis. The FAA continues to support ADS-B through ongoing software updates, performance monitoring, and equipment guidance. ADS-B Out broadcasts information about an aircraft through an onboard transmitter to a ground receiver, moving air traffic control from a radar-based system to a satellite-derived aircraft location system.

There is no such mandate for ADS-B In, which receives data and provides it to in-cockpit displays. The FAA airspace requirements intentionally exclude some airspace that is frequently used by general aviation.

The US Drug Enforcement Agency's aircraft and (other airborne US government surveillance) use the ADS-B method to identify in air while conducting operations.

Airspace Class	Altitude
A	All aircraft equipped
B	All aircraft equipped
C	All aircraft equipped
E	Where above both 10,000 ft MSL and also above 2,500 ft AGL

Operators can choose the 1090 megahertz extended squitter broadcast link, or the universal access transceiver broadcast link. FAA did not adopt higher performance standards that would enable all of the initial ADS-B In applications, but these can optionally be adopted.

==== Equipping aircraft ====
Fleet: 250,000 GA aircraft that will need ADS-B by 2020 of which 165,000 aircraft are subject to ADS-B Out (Class I and Class II aircraft that generally fly below 18 000 feet). FAA forecasts an increase in the GA fleet from 224,172 aircraft in 2010 to 270,920 aircraft in 2031, growing an average of 0.9% per year.

==== Funding resources ====
In April 2011, US federal legislation via House Bill for FAA reauthorization permits an "equipping fund" that includes a portion for some general aviation aircraft. The fund would provide financing at competitive rates backed by loan guarantees. A public-private partnership has been formed as the NextGen Equipage Fund, LLC which is managed by NEXA Capital Partners, LLC.

==== US implementation timetable ====
The Federal Aviation Administration ADS-B implementation was broken into three segments each with a corresponding timeline. Ground segment implementation and deployment began in 2009 and was completed by 2013. Airborne equipment is user-driven and is expected to be completed both voluntarily based on perceived benefits and through regulatory actions (Rulemaking) by the FAA. The cost to equip with ADS-B Out capability is relatively small and would benefit the airspace with surveillance in areas not currently served by radar. The FAA intends to provide similar service within the NAS to what radar is currently providing (5 nmi en route and 3 nmi terminal radar standards) as a first step to implementation. However, ADS-B In capability is viewed as the most likely way to improve NAS throughput and enhance capacity.

In December 2008, Acting FAA Administrator Robert A. Sturgell gave the go-ahead for ADS-B to go live in southern Florida. The south Florida installation, which consists of 11 ground stations and supporting equipment, is the first commissioned in the United States, although developmental systems have been online in Alaska, Arizona, and along the East Coast since 2004. The completed system will consist of 794 ground station transceivers. The December 2008 action is in compliance with a late-term executive order from George W. Bush which mandated accelerated approval of NextGen.

===== FAA segment 1 (2006–09) =====
ADS-B deployment and voluntary equipment, along with rule-making activities. Pockets of development will exploit equipment deployment in the areas that will provide proof of concept for integration to ATC automation systems deployed in the NAS. It is being developed at the FAA's William J. Hughes Technical Center near Egg Harbor City, New Jersey.

===== FAA segment 2 (2010–14) =====
ADS-B ground stations will be deployed throughout the NAS, with an in-service decision due in the 2012–2013 time frame. Completed deployment will occur in 2013–14. Equipment rules have been finalized and the current standards are DO-282B for UAT and DO-260B for 1090ES:

- Airport situational awareness – a combination of detailed airport maps, airport multilateration systems, ADS-B systems and enhanced aircraft displays have the potential to improve Airport Surface Situational Awareness (ASSA) significantly, and Final Approach and Runway Occupancy Awareness (FAROA).
- Oceanic In-trail – ADS-B may provide enhanced situational awareness and safety for Oceanic In-trail maneuvers as additional aircraft become equipped.
- Gulf of Mexico – in the Gulf of Mexico, where ATC radar coverage is incomplete, the FAA is locating ADS-B (1090 MHz) receivers on oil rigs to relay information received from aircraft equipped with ADS-B extended squitters back to the Houston Center to expand and improve surveillance coverage.
- Terminal Airspace – ADS-B is currently in service for two terminal airspace areas, Louisville, Kentucky, and Philadelphia, Pennsylvania.

===== FAA segment 3 (2015–20) =====
ADS-B In equipment will be based on user-perceived benefit but is expected to be providing increased situational awareness and efficiency benefits within this segment. Those aircraft that choose to equip in advance of any mandate will see benefits associated with preferential routes and specific applications. Limited radar decommissioning will begin in the time frame with an ultimate goal of a 50% reduction in the secondary surveillance radar infrastructure.

On 27 May 2010, the FAA published its final rule mandating that by 2020 all aircraft owners will be required to have ADS-B Out capabilities when operating in any airspace that currently requires a transponder (airspace classes A, B, and C, and airspace class E at certain altitudes).

On 14 June 2012, FreeFlight Systems and Chevron received STC for the first rule-compliant ADS-B installation in GOMEX helicopters that was awarded by the FAA.

==== Early adopters ====
Cargo Airline Association
Cargo carriers, notably UPS. They operate at their hub airports largely at night. Much of the benefit to these carriers is envisioned through merging and spacing the arriving and departing traffic to a more manageable flow. More environmentally friendly and efficient area navigation (RNAV) descent profiles, combined with CDTI, may allow crews to eventually aid controllers with assisted visual acquisition of traffic and limited cockpit-based separation of aircraft. The benefits to the carrier are fuel and time efficiencies associated with idle descent and shorter traffic patterns than typical radar vectoring allows.
Embry-Riddle Aeronautical University
ERAU has equipped its training aircraft at its two main campuses in Florida and Arizona with UAT ADS-B capability as a situational safety enhancement. The university has been doing this since May 2003, making it the first use in general aviation. With the addition of the Garmin G1000 flight instrument system to their fleet in 2006, ERAU became the first fleet to combine a glass cockpit with ADS-B.
University of North Dakota
UND has received an FAA grant to test ADS-B and has begun to outfit their Piper Warrior fleet with an ADS-B package.

==== Privacy ====
The FAA in America has come up with two systems to address privacy concerns

- Limiting Aircraft Data Displayed (LADD): Aircraft owners or designated representatives may request limiting aircraft data displayed (formally referred to as blocking) or unblocking flight tracking data. Flight tracking services that draw the data from FAA agree to block the information, though as noted elsewhere in this article, the data are unencrypted and may be available from non-FAA sources.
- Privacy ICAO Aircraft (PIA): Program to improve the privacy of eligible aircraft by enabling aircraft owners to request an alternate, temporary ICAO aircraft address, which will not be assigned to the owner in the Civil Aviation Registry (CAR). These are used in conjunction with a third party call sign: DCM (Garmin/Fltplan.com), FFL (ForeFlight), FWR (FlightAware), XAA (ARINCDirect/Collins Aerospace).

== System design considerations ==
A concern for any ADS-B protocol is the capacity for carrying ADS-B messages from aircraft, as well as allowing the radio channel to continue to support any legacy services. For 1090 ES, each ADS-B message is composed of a pair of data packets. The greater the number of packets transmitted from one aircraft, the fewer aircraft that can participate in the system, due to the fixed and limited channel data bandwidth.

System capacity is defined by establishing a criterion for what the worst environment is likely to be, then making that a minimum requirement for system capacity. For 1090 ES, both TCAS and ATCRBS/MSSR are existing users of the channel. 1090 ES ADS-B must not reduce the capacity of these existing systems.

The FAA national program office and other international aviation regulators are addressing concerns about ADS-B non-secure nature of ADS-B transmissions. ADS-B messages can be used to know the location of an aircraft, and there is no means to guarantee that this information is not used inappropriately. Additionally, there are some concerns about the integrity of ADS-B transmissions. ADS-B messages can be produced, with simple, low-cost measures, which spoof the locations of multiple phantom aircraft to disrupt safe air travel. There is no foolproof means to guarantee integrity, but there are means to monitor this type of activity. This problem is however similar to the usage of ATCRBS/MSSR where false signals also are potentially dangerous (uncorrelated secondary tracks).

There are some concerns about ADS-B dependence on satellite navigation systems to generate state vector information.

There are some general aviation concerns that ADS-B removes anonymity of the VFR aircraft operations. The ICAO 24-bit transponder code specifically assigned to each aircraft will allow monitoring of that aircraft when within the service volumes of the Mode-S/ADS-B system. Unlike the Mode A/C transponders, there is no code "1200"/"7000", which offers casual anonymity. Mode-S/ADS-B identifies the aircraft uniquely among all in the world, in a similar fashion as a MAC address for a network interface controller or the International Mobile Equipment Identity (IMEI) of a GSM phone. However, the FAA is allowing UAT-equipped aircraft to utilize a random self-assigned temporary ICAO address in conjunction with the use of beacon code 1200. 1090 ES-equipped aircraft using ADS-B will not have this option.

In order for the ADS-B system to function to the fullest extent, equipment for all aircraft in the airspace is required. This demands that transponder technology be scalable from the smallest aircraft to the largest aircraft to allow for 100% equipage for any given airspace. Current transponder technology is capable of equipping larger, traditional aircraft but a new type of transponder is required for equipping aircraft that are smaller and lighter or don't have electrical systems like the large traditionally transponder-equipped aircraft. The requirements for these smaller and lighter aircraft are mainly size, weight, and power (SWAP) and transponder technology must allow for equipage of these types of aircraft to enable saturation of ADS-B for total visibility in any given airspace.

On 7 June 2002 the FAA published a historical overview of its decision on the ADS-B link architecture for use in the National Airspace System (NAS).

== Technical and regulatory documents ==
- Minimum Aviation System Performance Standards (MASPS)
- Minimum Operational Performance Standards (MOPS)
- RTCA DO-242A — ADS-B MASPS. Describes system-wide operational use of ADS-B.

== Satellite-based ADS-B ==
ADS-B signals can also be received by payloads carried on low Earth orbit satellites, extending surveillance into oceanic and remote regions beyond the range of ground-based receivers. The first reception of ADS-B signals from space was demonstrated in 2013 by the European Space Agency's Proba-V satellite. By May 2015, the experiment had received more than 25 million aircraft positions.

The first operational space-based ADS-B service was introduced in 2019 by Aireon, using receivers hosted on the Iridium NEXT satellite constellation. On 27 March 2019, NATS and Nav Canada became the first air navigation service providers to use the service operationally in the North Atlantic, where satellite surveillance allowed reduced aircraft separation minima in airspace that had previously relied on procedural separation. NATS reported that, compared with a 2018 baseline, the system was reducing carbon dioxide emissions in the UK-managed North Atlantic by about 45,000 tonnes per year and airline fuel costs by about £19 million per year by 2023.

== See also ==
- Acronyms and abbreviations in avionics
- Advanced Train Control System, a conceptually similar system for railroads
- ASDE-X
- Automatic Identification System, a conceptually similar system for marine vessels
- Automatic Packet Reporting System (APRS), a conceptually similar GPS-based tracking system in the amateur radio service
- RTCA DO-212, minimal operational performance standards for airborne automatic surveillance (ADS)
- Eurocat (air traffic control)
- FLARM
- Flight tracking
- Free flight (air traffic control)
- GPS aircraft tracking
- Portable collision avoidance system
- Traffic collision avoidance system
- Transponder (aeronautics)
