= Squitter =

Random pulses in aviation radio systems

Squitter refers to random pulses, pulse-pairs and other non-solicited messages used in various aviation radio systems' signal maintenance. Squitter pulses were originally, and are still, used in the DME/TACAN air navigation systems. Squitter pulses, because of their randomness and identical appearance to standard reply pulse-pairs, appear the same as unsolicited/unsynchronised replies to other interrogating aircraft.

Squitter was first used in the original IFF systems. These used a superregenerative receiver which greatly amplified input signals using positive feedback. If the gain was set too high, random radio noise like static would enter the amplifier and cause it to send out a signal, creating random signals. An automatic gain control system on subsequent models cured this problem.

Primarily, squitter is used to maintain a regular signal from the ground beacon. In the TACAN system, signal strength variation due to rotation of the transmitting beam (amplitude modulation) determines the course bearing function. This function would be lost without a constant 2700-4800 pulse-pairs per second, carrier-like signal in cases of low or no interrogating aircraft.

In the Mode S secondary surveillance radar system, the term is used to describe messages that are unsolicited downlink transmissions from an automatic dependent surveillance-broadcast (ADS-B) Mode S transponder system.

Mode S transponders transmit acquisition squitter (unsolicited downlink transmissions) to permit passive acquisition by interrogators with broad antenna beams, where active acquisition may be hindered by all-call synchronous garble. Examples of such interrogators are an airborne collision avoidance system and an airport surface system.
