= Winds aloft =

Term used in weather forecast

Winds aloft, officially known as the winds and temperatures aloft forecast, (known as "FD" in the US and Canada, but becoming known as "FB", following the World Meteorological Organization [WMO] nomenclature), is a forecast of specific atmospheric conditions in terms of wind and temperature at certain altitudes, typically measured in feet (ft) above mean sea level (MSL). The forecast is specifically used for aviation purposes.

== Format ==
The components of a winds and temperatures aloft forecast are displayed as DDss+/-TT:

- Wind direction (DD) and wind speed (ss), displayed as a 4-digit number, e.g. 3127, indicating a wind direction of 310 degrees true north and a wind speed of 27 knots. Note that wind direction is rounded to the nearest 10 degrees and the trailing zero is excluded.
- Temperature (TT), displayed as a +/- two-digit number, indicating temperature in degrees Celsius.

Above 24,000 feet, the format changes by omitting a +/- sign on temperature. Temperatures at high aviation altitudes are below zero Celsius.

If the wind speed is forecast to be greater than 99 knots but less than 199 knots, the computer adds 50 to the direction and subtracts 100 from the speed. To decode this type of data group, the reverse must be accomplished. For example, when the data appears as “731960,” subtract 50 from the 73 and add 100 to the 19, and the wind would be 230° at 119 knots with a temperature of –60 °C. If the wind speed is forecast to be 200 knots or greater, the wind group is coded as 99 knots. For example, when the data appears as “7799,” subtract 50 from 77 and add 100 to 99, and the wind is 270° at 199 knots or greater. When the forecast wind speed is calm, or less than 5 knots, the data group is coded “9900,” which means light and variable.

== Example ==
FBUS31 KWNO 190440
DATA BASED ON 190000Z DATA VALID 190600Z FOR USE 0600-1200Z.
TEMPS NEG ABV 24000
FT  3000 6000    9000    12000   18000   24000   30000  34000  39000
ABR 1027 1326+01 1428-03 1431-09 1639-21 1749-34 175849 175957 174758
ABI      2849+04 2857-02 2760-07 2670-20 2682-32 760344 760648 259451

ABR, ABI, and ALS are the weather station abbreviations used in this report.

Wind speeds over 99 knots are decoded by subtracting 50 from the direction and adding 100 to the speed. Thus, for example, the wind forecast for Abilene (ABI) at 30,000 feet, shown above as 7603, indicates a forecast wind of 260 degrees at 103 knots (76-50=26 or 260, and speed became 100+03=103).

This forecast is now made four times a day based on 0000Z, 0600Z, 1200Z, and 1800Z data (the Z stands for Zulu and indicates Coordinated Universal Time). The forecasts are valid 6 (FD1/8), 12 (FD2/9), and 24 (FD3/10) hours after the observation date/times of 0000Z and 1200Z upon which they are based. Depending on station elevation, FD1/2/3 wind forecasts are issued for the following levels: 3, 6, 9, 12, 18, 24, 30, 34, and 39 thousand feet.

The first level for which a wind forecast is issued is 1,500 feet or more above the station elevation. Temperature is forecast for all wind levels, except the 3,000-foot level, that are 2,500 feet or more above the station. As indicated in the third line of the forecast, the temperatures at all levels above 24,000 feet are generally negative and the minus sign is excluded. FD8/9/10 are for the 45,000- and 53,000-foot levels.
