= Immigration Advisory Program =

U.S. Customs and Border Protection initiative at European airports

The Immigration Advisory Program (IAP) is a pilot program developed by the Department of Homeland Security's Customs and Border Protection that places teams at European airports to prevent undesirable people from traveling to the United States. The program is based on the Immigration Security Initiative of the former Immigration and Naturalization Service. It was appropriated $2,000,000 in fiscal year 2005.

Since 2004, IAP inspectors have made more than 1,000 no-board recommendations for high-risk or inadequately documented passengers, which equate to approximately $1.6 million in cost avoidance associated with detaining and removing passengers, and $1.5 million in potential savings to air carriers.
