= Fltplan.com =

Aviation services company

Flight Plan LLC
- Website type: Flight Planning
- Available in: English
- Owner: Garmin
- Website: www.fltplan.com
- Commercial: yes
- Launched: 1999; 27 years ago

FltPlan.com is a website that serves the general and corporate aviation community. Founded in 1999, it originally concentrated on flight planning. Its services now include flight tracking, e-APIS submissions, Safety Management Systems(SMS), GPS RAIM predictions, and an FAA-approved weather service.

== Overview ==
The website provides information and tools used by more than 85,000 active pilots to create, file and manage flights within the U.S., the Bahamas, Bermuda, Puerto Rico, Canadian, and Mexican airports. The site assists in the creation of professional IFR flight plans and navigational logs. It provides IFR routing, winds aloft, aircraft performance, an airport database, frequencies, FBO information and recommended alternates.

It was voted Best in Online Weather in the 2008 and 2009 Professional Pilot PRASE surveys.

== History ==
FltPlan.com was founded in 1999 by Ken Wilson. Wilson developed the flight planning software as a college project to assist general aviation pilots. The service grew to become a major provider in the North American market. By 2018, the company reported having over 165,000 registered users and managing more than 6.3 million flight plans a year.

On August 29, 2018, Garmin announced that it had acquired FltPlan.com for an undisclosed sum. At the time of the acquisition, FltPlan was noted for being the largest provider of flight planning services for business aviation in North America, with its system utilized by approximately 70% of N-registered turbine aircraft.

== E-APIS ==
In April 2009, the site announced its e-APIS (electronic advance passenger information service) manifest submission service. FltPlan.com was the first service to receive certification from the US Department of Homeland Security and Customs & Border Protection. Benefits of this service include integrating with flight plans, storage of passenger, aircraft, aircraft owner and crew information for e-APIS submissions. The service can be accessed from any web browser.

== Callsign ==
Fltplan
IATA	ICAO	Call sign
—	DCM	DOT COM
- Commenced operations: 2011
- Parent company: Garmin
- Headquarters: Trenton, Tennessee
- Website: fltplan.com

The site offers customers the ability to block tracking of their aircraft and flights by giving them flight numbers like an airline.
