= DO-212 =

Minimum Operational Performance Standards for Airborne Automatic Dependent Surveillance (ADS) Equipment
- Abbreviation: DO-232
- Latest version: October 26, 1992
- Organization: RTCA SC170
- Domain: Aviation

DO-212 is a performance standard published by RTCA, Incorporated. It contains Minimum Operational Performance Standards (MOPS) for aircraft equipment required for the Automatic Dependent Surveillance (ADS) function. The supporting hardware can be a stand-alone ADS unit or alternatively, the ADS function may be installed within other on-board equipment.

== Outline of contents ==
1. Purpose and Scope
2. Performance Requirements and Verification Procedures
3. Installed Equipment Performance
4. Terms and Acronyms
5. References
- These references are noted in DO-212
  - ISO 7498 Information Processing Systems—Open Systems Interconnection—Basic Reference Model
  - ISO 8072 Information Processing Systems—Open Systems Interconnection—Transport Service definition
  - ISO 8073 Information Processing Systems—Open Systems Interconnection—Connection oriented transport protocol specification
  - ISO 8073 Addendum 4 Information Processing Systems—Open Systems Interconnection—Connection oriented transport protocol specification, Protocol enhancements
  - ISO 8473 Information Processing Systems—Data Communications—Protocol for providing the connectionless-mode network service
  - ISO 8348 Information Processing Systems—Data Communications—Network Services Definition
  - ISO 8348 Addendum 1 Information Processing Systems—Data Communications—Network Services Definition, Connectionless-mode transmission
  - DO-178B Software Considerations in Airborne Systems and Equipment Certification
  - DO-205 Design Guidelines and Recommended Standards To Support Open Systems Interconnection for Aeronautical Mobile Communications. Part 1—Internetworking
- Appendix A: Suggested Timer Values

== See also ==
- Automatic Dependent Surveillance-Broadcast
- Air traffic control
- ACARS
