= Airspace types (United States) =

U.S. airspace system classification scheme

The United States airspace system's classification scheme is intended to maximize pilot flexibility within acceptable levels of risk appropriate to the type of operation and traffic density within that class of airspace – in particular to provide separation and active control in areas of dense or high-speed flight operations.

The Albert Roper (1919-10-13 The Paris Convention) implementation of International Civil Aviation Organization (ICAO) airspace classes defines classes A through G (with the exception of class F which is not used in the United States). The other U.S. implementations are described below. The United States also defines categories of airspace that may overlap with classes of airspace. Classes of airspace are mutually exclusive. Thus, airspace can be "class E" and "restricted" at the same time, but it cannot be both "class E" and "class B" at the same location and at the same time.

Note: All airspace classes except class G require air traffic control (ATC) clearance for instrument flight rules (IFR) operations.

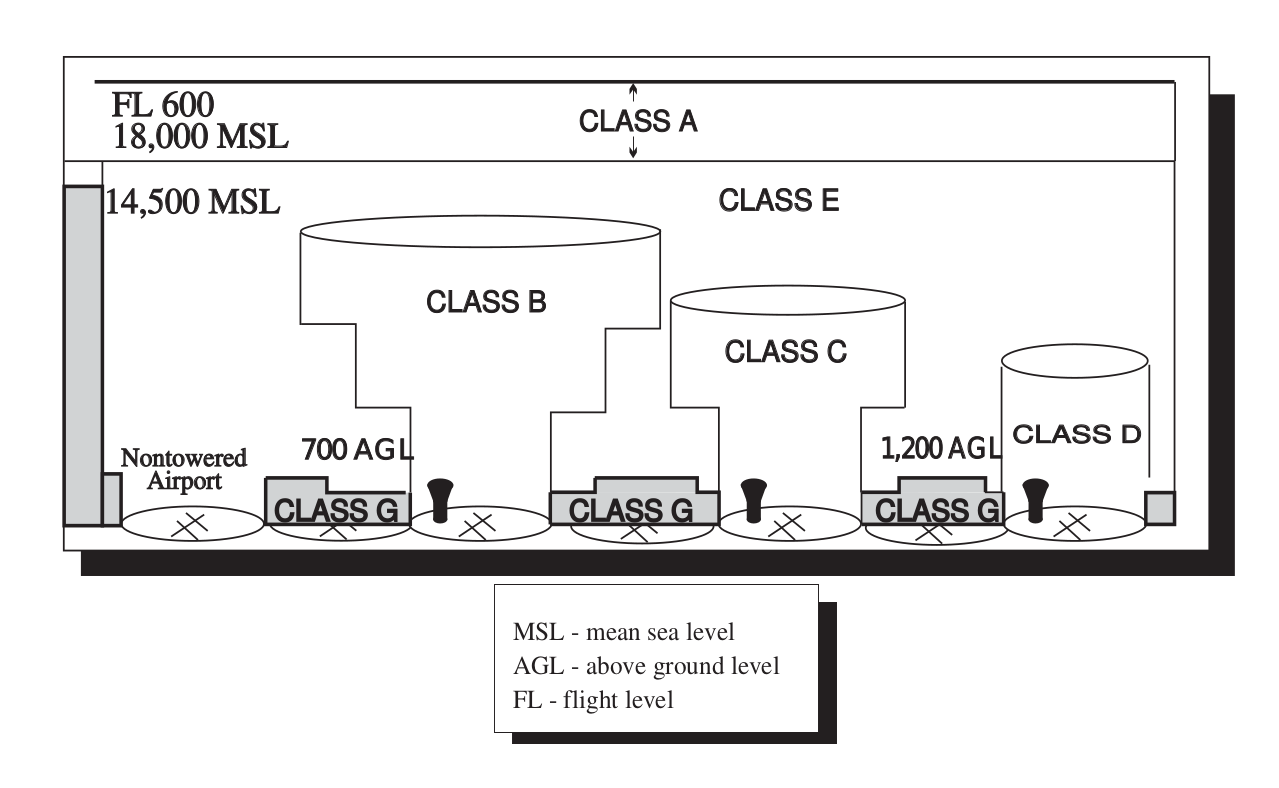
Airspace classes in the United States

== Airspace classes ==
In the U.S., airspace is categorized as regulatory and non-regulatory. Within these categories exist: controlled (classes A, B, C, D, and E) and uncontrolled (class G) airspace, based on which air traffic control service is provided to IFR flights and some VFR flights. Class F is not used in the U.S. Besides controlled and uncontrolled airspace, other types of airspace include "special use" and "other airspace".

=== Class A ===
Class A airspace extends from 18,000 feet (5,500 m) mean sea level MSL to FL600 (approximately 60,000 feet (18,000 m) MSL) throughout the contiguous United States and Alaska. Unlike the altitude measurements used in other airspace classes, the FLnnn flight levels used in class A airspace are pressure altitudes referenced to a standardized altimeter setting of 29.92" InHg and thus the true altitudes depend on local atmospheric pressure variations.

Unless otherwise authorized by ATC, all flight operations in class A airspace must be under ATC control, and must be operating IFR, under a clearance received prior to entry. An example of an exception to IFR-only flight in this airspace is the use of wave windows. These specific airspace blocks may be opened by ATC to allow sailplanes to fly in the lee waves of mountains.

Since class A airspace is normally restricted to instrument flight only, there are no minimum visibility requirements.

Class A airspace was formerly known as Positive Control Airspace (PCA).

=== Class B ===
Class B airspace is defined around key airport traffic areas, usually airspace surrounding the busiest airports in the US according to the number of IFR operations and passengers served. The exact shape of the airspace varies from one class B area to another, but in most cases it has the shape of an inverted wedding cake, with a series of circular "shelves" of airspace of several thousand feet in thickness centered on a specific airport. Each shelf is larger than the one beneath it. Class B airspace normally begins at the surface in the immediate area of the airport, and successive shelves of greater and greater radius begin at higher and higher altitudes at greater distances from the airport. Many class B airspaces diverge from this model to accommodate traffic patterns or local topological or other features. The upper limit of class B airspace is normally 10,000 feet (3,000 m) MSL.

All aircraft entering class B airspace must obtain ATC clearance prior to entry and must be prepared for denial of clearance. Aircraft must be equipped with a two-way radio for communications with ATC, an operating Mode C transponder and automatic altitude reporting equipment. Furthermore, aircraft overflying the upper limit of any class B airspace must have an operating Mode C transponder. Visual flight rules (VFR) flights may proceed under their own navigation after obtaining clearance but must obey any explicit instructions given by ATC. Some class B airspaces include special transition routes for VFR flight that require communication with ATC but may not require an explicit clearance. Other class B airspaces include VFR corridors through which VFR flights may pass without clearance (and without technically entering the class B airspace).

VFR flights operating in class B airspace must have three miles (5 km) of visibility and must remain clear of clouds (no minimum distance).

Class B airspace has the most stringent rules of all the airspaces in the United States. Class B has strict rules on pilot certification. Pilots operating in class B airspace must have a private pilot's certificate, or have met the requirement of 14 CFR 61.95. These are often interpreted to mean "have an instructor's endorsement for having been properly trained in that specific class B space". However, it does not apply to student pilots seeking sport or recreational certificates. Some class B airports (within class B airspaces) prohibit student pilots from taking off and landing there.

In addition to this, some class B airspaces prohibit special VFR flights.

Certain class B airports have a mode C veil, which encompasses airspace within thirty nautical miles of the airport. Aircraft operating within the Mode C veil must have an operating Mode C transponder (up to 10,000 feet (3,000 m) MSL) unless the aircraft is certified without an engine-driven electrical system, operates outside the class B, below the ceiling of the class B and below 10,000 feet (3,000 m) MSL.

=== Class C ===
Class C space is structured in much the same way as class B airspace, but on a smaller scale. Class C airspace is defined around airports of moderate importance; airports with regular commercial passenger jet service of 100 passengers per flight or more are typically Class C. The FAA requirements for Class C airspace status are an operational control tower, a radar-controlled approach system, and a minimum number of IFR approaches conducted per year. The airspace class designation is in effect only during the hours of tower and approach operation at the primary airport; the airspace reverts to Class D if approach control is not operating, and to class E or G if the tower is closed. The vertical boundary is usually 4,000 feet (1,200 m) above the airport surface. The core surface area has a radius of five nautical miles (9 km), and goes from the surface to the ceiling of the class C airspace. The upper "shelf" area has a radius of ten nautical miles, and extends from as low as 1,200 feet (370 m) up to the ceiling of the airspace. A procedural "outer area" (not to be confused with the shelf area) has a radius of 20 nautical miles.

All aircraft entering class C airspace must establish two-way radio communication with ATC prior to entry; explicit clearance to enter is not required; however, the controller of Class C space may instruct aircraft initiating communication to "remain outside" the airspace. The aircraft must be equipped with a two-way radio and an operating Mode C (altitude reporting) radar transponder, furthermore aircraft overflying above the upper limit of class C airspace upward to 10,000 feet MSL must have an operating Mode C transponder. VFR flights in class C airspace must have three miles (5 km) of visibility, and fly an altitude at least 500 feet (150 m) below, 1,000 feet (300 m) above, and 2,000 feet (600 m) laterally from clouds.

There is no specific pilot certification required. Aircraft speeds must be below 200 knots (230 mph) at or below 2,500 feet (760 m) above the ground, and within 4 nautical miles (7 km) of the class C airport.

=== Class D ===
Class D airspace is typically established around any airport with a functioning control tower, but that does not see significant IFR approaches which would make Class B or C more appropriate (usually because there is no scheduled commercial passenger service). Class D airspace is generally cylindrical in form and normally extends from the surface to 2,500 feet (760 m) above the ground. Airspace within the given radius, but in surrounding class C or class B airspace, is excluded. Class D airspace reverts to class E or G during hours when the tower is closed, or under other special conditions.

Two-way communication with ATC must be established before entering class D airspace, but no transponder is required. VFR cloud clearance and visibility requirements are the same as class C.

=== Class E ===
Controlled airspace which is neither class A, B, C nor D. In most areas of the United States, class E airspace extends from 1,200 feet (370 m) above ground level (AGL) up to but not including 18,000 feet (5,500 m) MSL, the lower limit of class A airspace. There are areas where class E airspace begins at either the surface (SFC) or 700 AGL, these areas are used to transition between the terminal and en-route environments (around non-towered airports). These areas are designated on sectional charts. Most airspace in the United States is class E. The airspace above FL600 is also class E. No ATC clearance or radio communication is required for VFR flight in class E airspace. VFR visibility and cloud clearance requirements are the same as for class C and D airspaces when below 10,000 feet (3,000 m) MSL. Above 10,000 ft MSL, the visibility requirement is extended to 5 miles (8 km) and the cloud clearance requirement is extended to 1,000 feet (300 m) below clouds, 1,000 feet (300 m) above, and 1 mile (1.6 km) laterally.

=== Class G ===
Class G airspace includes all airspace below 14,500 feet (4,400 m) MSL not otherwise classified as controlled. There are no entry or clearance requirements for class G airspace, even for IFR operations. Class G airspace is typically the airspace very near the ground (1,200 feet or less), beneath class E airspace and between class B-D cylinders around towered airstrips.

Radio communication is not required in class G airspace, even for IFR operations. Class G is completely uncontrolled.

VFR visibility requirements in class G airspace are 1 mile (1.6 km) by day, and 3 miles (5 km) by night, for altitudes below 10,000 feet (3,050 m) MSL but above 1,200 ft AGL. Beginning at 10,000 feet MSL, 5 miles (8 km) of visibility are required, day and night. Cloud clearance requirements are to maintain an altitude that is 500 ft below, 1,000 ft above, 2,000 ft horizontal; at or above 10,000 ft MSL, they are 1,000 ft below, 1,000 ft above, and 1 mile laterally. By day at 1,200 feet (370 m) AGL and below, aircraft must remain clear of clouds, and there is no minimum lateral distance.

There are certain exceptions where class G extends above 1,200 feet AGL. This is usually either over mountainous terrain (e.g., some areas in the Rocky Mountains), or over very sparsely populated areas (e.g., some parts of Montana and Alaska).

		Class A	Class B	Class C	Class D	Class E		Class G				
Colors		Not depicted	solid cyan border	solid magenta border	dashed cyan border	E from SFC: dashed magenta border						
Colors		Not depicted	solid cyan border	solid magenta border	dashed cyan border	G from SFC-699' AGL, E from 700' AGL: shaded magenta						
Colors		Not depicted	solid cyan border	solid magenta border	dashed cyan border	G from SFC-1,199' AGL, E from 1,200' AGL: shaded cyan						
Height		18,000' MSL to FL600	Specific to each Class B. Varies from SFC-7,000' MSL to SFC-12,500' MSL	SFC-4,000' AGL	SFC-2,500' AGL	· SFC/700'/1,200' to 17,999' MSL · Above FL600		Varies. Typically SFC-700' AGL or SFC-1,200' AGL above the airport				
License		Instrument Rating	SPL w/ endorsement (PPL required at some Class B)	Any	Any	Any		Any				
Clearance Required?		Yes	Yes	Established 2-way radio communication required	Established 2-way radio communication required	No		No				
Radius		N/A	30 NM (varies)	10 NM	4 NM	Varies		N/A				
Radius		N/A	30 NM (varies)	Below 1200 ft - 5 NM	4 NM	Varies		N/A				
Communication Required		2-way radio	2-way radio	2-way radio	2-way radio	-	-	-		-		-
Transponder Required		Mode C	Mode C	Mode C (and above too)	-	-	Mode A	-		-		-
Weather minimums	Visibility	IFR only	3 SM	3 SM	3 SM	3 SM	5 SM	Day	Night	Day	Night	5 SM
Weather minimums	Visibility	IFR only	3 SM	3 SM	3 SM	3 SM	5 SM	1 SM	3 SM	1 SM	3 SM	5 SM
Weather minimums	Clouds	IFR only	Clear of clouds	· 1,000' above · 500' below · 2,000' horizontally	· 1,000' above · 500' below · 2,000' horizontally	· 1,000' above · 500' below · 2,000' horizontally	· 1,000' above · 1,000' below · 1 SM horizontally	Clear of clouds	· 1,000' above · 500' below · 2,000' horizontally	· 1,000' above · 500' below · 2,000' horizontally	· 1,000' above · 500' below · 2,000' horizontally	· 1,000' above · 1,000' below · 1 SM horizontally
Weather minimums	Clouds	IFR only	Visibility at least 3 SM + ceiling of 1000'									
Speed Restriction		< Mach 1	· < Mach 1 · < 250 KIAS while below 10,000' MSL									
Speed Restriction		< Mach 1	< 200 KIAS under B shelf or in VFR corridor	< 200 KIAS while below 2,500' AGL and within 4 NM of primary airport								

== Special use airspace ==
Some airspace categories have no correlation with ICAO airspace classes but are nevertheless important in United States airspace. The airspace class (A, B, etc.) in which special use airspace is found still controls the requirements and procedures for flying into/through it.

=== Alert areas ===
Alert areas are depicted on aeronautical charts to inform non-participating pilots of areas that may contain a high volume of pilot training or an unusual type of aerial activity. Pilots should be particularly alert when flying in these areas. All activity within an alert area must be conducted in accordance with CFRs, without waiver, and pilots of participating aircraft as well as pilots transiting the area must be equally responsible for collision avoidance.

Alert areas contain special hazards that pilots must take into consideration when entering the areas.

=== Warning areas ===
A warning area is airspace of defined dimensions, extending from three nautical miles outward from the coast of the U.S., that contains activity that may be hazardous to non-participating aircraft. The purpose of such warning areas is to warn non-participating pilots of the potential danger. A warning area may be located over domestic or international waters or both.

=== Restricted airspace ===
Entry into restricted areas is prohibited under certain conditions without a special clearance obtained from the controlling agency obtained directly or via ATC. Examples of restricted areas include test firing ranges and other military areas with special hazards or containing sensitive zones (such as the one over Groom Lake).

=== Prohibited airspace ===
Entry into prohibited areas is forbidden under all circumstances, except for an emergency, and the only aircraft that can access such specific areas are military aircraft with extremely special clearance, such as Marine One landing on the White House's South Lawn. Prohibited areas exist over a handful of extremely sensitive locations, such as the White House, National Wildlife Refuge, Boundary Waters Canoe Area Wilderness and The National Mall.

=== Military operation area (MOA) ===
Military operation areas (MOA) are areas in which military activities are regularly conducted. No clearance is required to enter MOAs, but pilots should verify with ATC or flight service station that no hazardous activity is underway before entering an MOA.

In the United States, civilian and military pilots have equal rights to MOA airspace, and both have equal responsibility to see and avoid other air traffic. MOAs serve as a warning, since military aircraft often fly at high speeds and are intentionally difficult to see.

=== Controlled firing areas (CFA) ===
Areas in which activities could be hazardous to aircraft and distinguished from other special use airspace in that its activities are suspended immediately when an aircraft might be approaching the area. As a result, these areas do not appear on aeronautical charts.

=== National security areas (NSA) ===
National security areas consist of airspace of defined vertical and lateral dimensions established at locations where there is a requirement for increased security and safety of ground facilities. Pilots are requested to voluntarily avoid flying through the depicted NSA. When it is necessary to provide a greater level of security and safety, flight in NSAs may be temporarily prohibited by regulation under the provisions of 14 CFR Section 99.7. Regulatory prohibitions will be issued by System Operations, System Operations Airspace and AIM Office, Airspace and Rules, and disseminated via NOTAM. Inquiries about NSAs should be directed to Airspace and Rules.

== Other airspace areas ==
The FAA designates other areas of airspace that do not fit the definitions of the classes of airspace above or special use airspace. With the exception of Temporary Flight Restrictions, these airspace areas do not confer any regulatory requirements on pilots; they are instead designated to draw special attention to an unusual activity or hazard, or to provide additional services to participating pilots.

=== Airport advisory/information service area ===
Local Airport Advisory (LAA) service is provided within 10 statute miles of an airport where a Flight Service Station is located and a control tower is not operating. The FSS provides advisories regarding weather and known traffic to all participating aircraft within the area, in effect acting as an "advisory" tower which helps to coordinate traffic, but does not directly control it. At these airports Flight Service also serves the function of relaying ATC clearances to IFR aircraft. Participation by VFR aircraft is not required.

A similar service, Remote Airport Advisory (RAA), is provided at non-towered airports that do not have a FSS but nonetheless have a level of activity that is high enough to justify the service. At these airports communication is "remoted" to a nearby FSS.

=== Terminal radar service area (TRSA) ===
Terminal radar service area, or TRSA, is general controlled airspace wherein ATC provides radar vectoring, sequencing, and separation on a full-time basis for all IFR and participating VFR aircraft. Service provided at a TRSA is called "stage III service". TRSA's are depicted on VFR aeronautical charts. Pilot participation is urged but is not mandatory.

They are designated in high volume traffic areas where radar services are available, but not otherwise designated as class B or C airspace, such as in the Palm Springs area in Southern California where high mountainous terrain channels air traffic into the same busy space. TRSA's can sometimes be found around class D airports as well, such as East Texas Regional Airport in Longview, TX/Kilgore, TX, Chicago Rockford International Airport in Rockford, IL, Augusta Regional Airport in Augusta, GA, and Kalamazoo/Battle Creek International Airport in Kalamazoo, MI.

When VFR, pilots need not contact TRACON prior to entry or while in any TRSA; however, it is recommended they do so. There are no specific equipment requirements to operate VFR in a TRSA. If pilots ask for and receive radar services from TRACON, they must comply with heading and altitudes assigned or cancel the service.

=== Temporary flight restriction (TFR) ===
Temporary flight restrictions are designated by NOTAM and are used to clear the airspace in special circumstances that could be hazardous to aircraft not participating in the event for which the TFR was issued. Situations in which TFRs are typically used include forest fires and other natural disasters, air shows, some instances of criminal activity, extensions of restricted airspace to allow expansion of military training operations, and during movement of the President and certain other high-level government officials.

=== Military Training Route (MTR) ===
A Military Training Route is a specific route allowing high speed, low-level flight by military aircraft for training purposes. Specifically, these routes allow participating military aircraft to exceed the normal 250 knot speed limit which applies to all aircraft operating below 10,000 feet MSL. MTRs are depicted on VFR sectional charts and IFR low-altitude en route charts to assist pilots in locating and avoiding them, but nonparticipating pilots are not restricted from flying within an MTR.

While the altitude limits of each route are not depicted on ordinary charts, the numbering system partially reveals this information. Routes are first designated as either VFR (VR) or IFR (IR) routes. Then, a numeric code identifies the individual route. A route with a 4-digit code contains no segment higher than 1,500 feet AGL, while a 3-digit code indicates that one or more segments of the route exist at altitudes higher than 1,500 feet AGL. For example, the route VR1234 would indicate a VFR route exclusively below 1,500 feet AGL, while IR567 would indicate an IFR route with at least one segment higher than 1,500 feet AGL.

=== Parachute jump areas ===
In order to help alert aircraft to the presence of parachute jumping operations, the FAA maintains a list of designated parachute jump areas in the Airport/Facility Directory. While there is no restriction on operating within a parachute jump area, pilots should exercise extreme caution in such areas.

== VFR chart notation ==
Specific conventions are used to indicate airspace boundaries on VFR sectional and terminal area charts (TACs) for the United States.

=== Class A ===
Class A airspace is not shown on VFR charts, since it is assumed to extend from 18,000 FT to FL600 everywhere.

=== Class B ===
Class B airspace is denoted by a heavy blue border. Each distinct segment of class B airspace contains figures indicating the upper and lower altitude limits of that segment in units of one hundred feet, shown as a fraction, e.g., 100 over 40 indicates a ceiling of 10,000 feet (3,000 m) MSL and a floor of 4,000 feet (1,200 m) MSL (SFC indicates that the segment begins at the surface). In some areas each segment may also be assigned a letter for identification during communication with ATC.

In many cases the boundaries of class B airspace segments are coincident with specific radials from a specific VOR station or with specific distances from such a station; these are normally marked on the chart. In other cases, the boundaries may follow natural topological features or may be defined in other ways, which may or may not be explicitly indicated on the chart.

=== Class C ===
Class C airspace is denoted by a heavy magenta border. Each distinct segment of class C airspace contains figures indicating the upper and lower altitude limits of that segment in units of one hundred feet, shown as a fraction, e.g., 100 over 40 indicates a ceiling of 10,000 feet (3,000 m) MSL and a floor of 4,000 feet (1,200 m) MSL. (SFC indicates that the segment begins at the surface, and T indicates that the ceiling ends where overlying class B airspace begins.)

In many cases the boundaries of class C airspace segments are coincident with specific radials from a specific VOR station or with specific distances from such a station; these are normally marked on the chart. In other cases, the boundaries may follow natural topological features or may be defined in other ways, which may or may not be explicitly indicated on the chart.

=== Class D ===
Class D airspace is delimited by a thin, dashed blue line, generally in the form of a circle centered on an airport. A number enclosed in a box surrounded by a similar dashed line (ceiling value) and usually within the class D area gives the upper limit of the airspace in hundreds of feet (the lower limit of class D is always the surface). A MINUS ceiling value indicates surface up to but not including that value.

=== Class E ===
Class E airspace is denoted in different ways depending on its lower altitude limit. Airspace in this class that begins at the default altitude of 14,500 feet (4,420 m) MSL is not delimited. Class E airspace that begins at 700 feet (210 m) AGL is delimited by a broad, shaded magenta border. Airspace in class E that begins at the surface is delimited by a thin, dashed magenta line (this type of class E is most often seen as an extension to class D airspace that facilitates control of IFR routes to and from an airport).

In many cases, the expanse of airspace that is class E beginning at 1,200 feet (370 m) AGL is so large that only the areas that differ are marked on the chart. Thus, one may see only external borders within the chart, with the 1,200-foot (370 m) region extending off the chart.

When class E airspace begins at altitudes other than 1,200 feet (370 m) AGL, 700 feet (210 m) AGL, or 14,500 feet (4,400 m) MSL, a delimiting border resembling links in a chain in dark cyan separates the areas, and specific altitudes are marked within or near them.
