= Flighty =

Flight tracking application

- Logo used by Flighty
- Developers: Flighty, LLC
- Release: 2019; 7 years ago
- Stable release: 4.7.1 (6 November 2025; 11 months ago) [±]
- Operating system: iOS and macOS
- Size: 153.6 MB
- Available in: 1 languages
- List of languages English
- Website: flighty.com

Flighty is a flight tracking application for iOS and macOS. It includes flight tracking information, delay information, lifetime flying statistics, and a way to share your flights with friends.

The app has received generally favorable reviews, including positive reviews from various news outlets.

== History ==
Flighty was launched in 2019, and was founded by Ryan Jones, a former Apple employee, and two others. According to Jones, it was conceived during a long flight delay, inspiring an app that helps track delays and other flight information.

== Features ==
The app features a "25-hour where's my plane" feature that allows you to see where your plane's (through its tail number) next stops are before it arrives at your airport. It also shows arrival performance for the past 60 days, and monitors for potential delays and connection statuses. The app additionally allows for importing flights from emails, calendar, and TripIt available through its premium subscription plan.

The app additionally offers a premium subscription titled "Flighty Pro," available in plans of $5/week, $60/year or $300 for lifetime. The first flight a user enters will have all the pro features enabled as a trial.

On July 25, 2023, Flighty released an update adding "Flighty Friends," a feature designed to share upcoming flights with friends.

On December 12, 2023, Flighty released an update adding "Flighty Passport," a way to view your flight stats at a glance. Additionally, users can summarize delays and view their aircraft history.

On August 6, 2024, Flighty released an update that added in-depth delay warnings. Flighty is able to detect air traffic control and FAA mandates, such as airport grounds and stops, weather, closed runways, taxiway congestion, and other mandates, and late arriving aircraft. The feature is powered by machine learning. This feature is only available for Flighty Pro users.

== Awards ==
In 2023, Flighty won the Apple Design Award for interaction, and was a finalist for Apple's App of the Year award.

== Competition ==
Competitors of Flighty include services and products like FlightRadar24, FlightAware, ByAir, Nextfly, and Plane Finder.
