= OpenSky Network =

Non-commercial, research-oriented flight-tracking platform

OpenSky Network Association
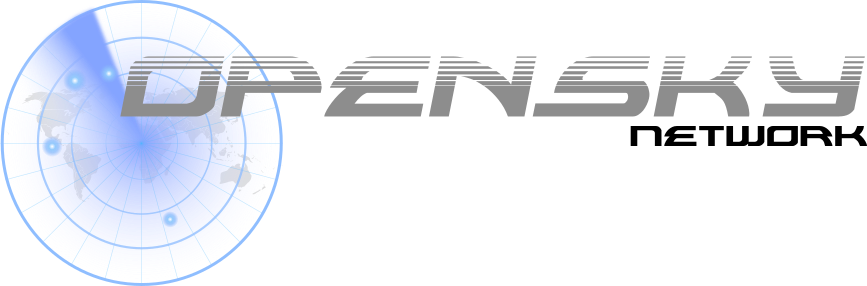
- Website type: Monitoring of aircraft
- Available in: English
- Headquarters: Burgdorf, Switzerland
- Country of origin: Switzerland
- Owner: OpenSky Network Association
- Website: opensky-network.org
- Commercial: No
- Registration: Free
- Launched: 2015
- Current status: Active

The OpenSky Network is a non-profit association based in Switzerland that provides open access of flight tracking control data. It was set up as a research project by several universities and government entities with the goal to improve the security, reliability and efficiency of the airspace. Its main function is to collect, process and store air traffic control data and provide open access to this data to the public. Similar to many existing flight trackers such as Flightradar24 and FlightAware, the OpenSky Network consists of a multitude of receivers (currently around 2000, mostly concentrated in Europe and the US), which are connected to the Internet by volunteers, industrial supporters, academic, and governmental organizations. All collected raw data is archived in a large historical database, containing over 23 trillion air traffic control messages (November 2020). The database is primarily used by researchers from different areas to analyze and improve air traffic control technologies and processes.

The main air traffic control communication technologies currently used by the OpenSky Network are the Automatic Dependent Surveillance-Broadcast (ADS-B), Mode S and, since late 2018, FLARM. All technologies provide immediate and detailed aircraft information over the publicly accessible 1090 MHz radio frequency channel using software-defined radio receivers.

== Aircraft Tracking Data ==
Currently, the network tracks and displays several thousand flights at any given time. The OpenSky Network offers access to its data through a variety of means, including several APIs and a Trino shell (the previous Impala shell is deprecated as of June 2024). Data from the OpenSky Network is free for research done in academic and governmental institutions. Commercial licenses are also available, as are branded software-defined receiver kits. A comparison in February 2017 found that it still had significantly less coverage than both FlightAware and Flightradar24 in February 2017. However, a separate study found its data quality to be superior.

== History ==
The OpenSky Network started in 2012 as a research project between armasuisse (Switzerland), University of Kaiserslautern (Germany), and the University of Oxford (UK). In 2015, the OpenSky Network association was founded in order to guarantee the continuous development of the network towards a completely open air traffic control sensor network with worldwide coverage. By November 2022, data from the OpenSky Network has been used in over 350 academic publications. The community gathers in a yearly workshop or symposium, which, since its 7th iteration in 2019, publishes academic proceedings.

== See also ==
- FlightAware
- Flightradar24
- Flight tracking
