= Fr24 =

FR24 may refer to:

- France 24, a French state-owned international news television network based in Paris
- Flightradar24, a Swedish internet-based service that shows real-time commercial aircraft flight tracking information on a map
