= WL Ross & Co =

American private equity company

WL Ross & Co. LLC
- Type: Subsidiary
- Industry: Finance
- Founded: April 2000
- Founder: Wilbur Ross
- Headquarters: New York City, NY, U.S.
- Number of locations: 1166 Avenue of the Americas, New York City, NY, U.S.
- Key people: Wilbur Ross; Stephen James Toy; Mr. M. Marquette Chester; Wendy L. Teramoto; Gregory A. Stoeckle.
- Services: restructuring, buyout, turnaround management, mergers and acquisitions
- Parent: Invesco (2006-)
- Subsidiaries: International Steel Group (ISG) (2002-2005)
- Website: WL Ross & Co.

WL Ross & Co is a private equity company founded and based in New York by Wilbur Ross in April 2000. The company focuses on investments in financially distressed companies with undervalued stocks, in the $100 to $200 million range, usually in the United States, Asia, Korea, Ireland, Japan, France and China. By acquiring majority stake in their investments through purchases and/or buyouts, WL Ross & Co. LLC then have the option of restructuring, turnarounds, mergers, reorganizations and industry consolidation. Starting in 2002, WL Ross began acquiring the assets of bankrupt steel companies such as LTV Steel Corp, Bethlehem Steel, Weirton Steel, Acme Steel, Georgetown Steel, Youngstown Sheet and Tube, and Republican Steel. By 2003 Ross had established relationships with the United Steelworkers, promising to save jobs. WL Ross founded the company International Steel Group (ISG) by combining bankrupt LTV Corp., Acme Steel and Bethlehem Steel, which quickly became the largest integrated steel company in the United States and was a Fortune 500 company by 2005.

In April 2005, WL Ross sold ISG to Luxembourg-based Mittal Steel, the largest steel company in the world, for $4.5 billion, half in cash and half in stock. Mittal had been acquiring and merging with companies since 1989 under the tenure of President and CEO, Lakshmi Mittal. On February 25, 2005, Reuters reported that Mittal planned on cutting up to 45,000 steel workers' jobs from 2005 to 2010 in the United States.

Since 2006, WL Ross & Co. LLC, has been operating as a wholly owned subsidiary of Invesco Ltd, an American investment management company headquartered in Atlanta, Georgia, with Ross as CEO and which operates under WL Ross brand names, among others.

== Headquarters ==
According to Bloomberg Businessweek, Company WL Ross & Co. LLC was founded in April 2000 with headquarters in New York and offices in Mumbai, India.

== History ==
Before founding WL Ross & Company, Ross ran the bankruptcy restructuring practice at N M Rothschild & Sons in New York beginning in the late 1970s. In April 2000 Ross left Rothschild to found WL Ross & Co. According to Forbes, He bought out a "$200 million Rothschild investment fund he had been managing". He then raised $250 million from investors to invest in distressed assets. In 2000 WL Ross investment team included David H. Storper, David L. Wax, Stephen J. Toy, and Pamela K. Wilson, a J.P. Morgan & Co. veteran.

== Investments, acquisitions and mergers ==
The company focuses on investments in financially distressed companies in the $100 to $200 million range usually, but not exclusively, in the United States, Asia, Korea, Ireland, Japan, France and China. By acquiring majority stake in their investments through purchases and/or buyouts, WL Ross & Co. LLC then have the option of restructuring, turnarounds, mergers, reorganizations and industry consolidation. WL Ross & Co has also invested in the public equity markets.

== The steel industry ==
=== International Steel Group (2002–2005) ===
A number of factors contributed to the demise of the steel industry in the United States. Along with the imports of less expensive steel, labor relations and lack of technological innovation plagued the industry. By the 2000s, "hundreds of thousands of people employed by the American steel industry had lost jobs and benefits".

In February 2002, W.L. Ross & Co. had made an agreement to purchase the assets of bankrupt LTV Steel Corp for "$125 million in cash and $200 million in assumed liabilities." After Ross acquired LTV, Ross's team approached [then-Commerce Secretary] Donald Evans when the George W. Bush White House seemed to be "looking to save thousands of jobs in the beleaguered [steel] industry." Ross told New Yorker Magazine in a 2004 interview, "I had read the International Trade Commission report, and it seemed like it was going to happen. We talked to everyone in Washington." They asked Evans about stiffer tariffs on Chinese steel as recommended by the International Trade Commission. In response to their inquiries about the possibility of "more protectionist measures", Evans replied, "absolutely". Ross denied that he had benefited from "inside information from the US administration." On March 5, 2002, when President Bush announced steel tariffs "of up to 30 percent on most imported steel, to be imposed for three years," he angered many trade partners. The United States trade representative, Robert B. Zoellick, explained that "domestic politics" was behind the tariffs. By December 2003, the US faced with a trade war with the EU and Japan and the potential of the imposition of retaliatory sanctions worth $2.2bn, the Bush administration lifted the illegal tariffs on steel imports. According to Forbes, the tariffs were intended to help the steel industry and to give a "political advantage" to the Bush administration" in "steel-industry states such as Pennsylvania and West Virginia." Bush won with a narrow margin in West Virginia, a steel industry state which was a Democratic stronghold. In 2000, he had promised to "look out for steelworkers' interests." According to Forbes, although the tariff was in effect only from March 2002 to December 2003, Ross benefited from the tariff as "the price of domestic steel [went] up 25% in that time."

Ross purchased the assets of several steel companies—including the bankrupt steel maker LTV Steel Corp and formed the Cleveland, Ohio–based company International Steel Group (ISG) by combining LTV Corp., Acme Steel and Bethlehem Steel. According to the New York Magazine, "between the tariffs, China's suddenly insatiable demand for steel, and the U.S. automakers' zero-percent financing push", the price of American steel "soared and Ross took ISG public in December 2003." Eventually WL Ross & Co. LLC through ISG acquired Weirton Steel in April 2004, Acme Steel, Bethlehem Steel and Georgetown Steel. In March 2003, when Cleveland, Ohio–based ISG agreed to purchase assets of the bankrupt Bethlehem Steel, with headquarters in Bethlehem, Pennsylvania, ISG was set to become the United States' "largest integrated steel company" with a "shipment capability of 16 million tons." ISG had acquired Bethlehem Steel assets included including its six massive plants. Bethlehem Steel, which had been the second largest steel producer in the United States, had filed for bankruptcy in 2001.

Under Ross, the steel workers at LTV returned to work with "new work rules", and without their pensions. Instead they had 401(k)s. When WL Ross acquired Bethlehem Steel, the steelworkers there accepted the same conditions. By December 2003, Ross had the support of the local steelworkers union.

On April 22, 2004, U.S. federal bankruptcy Judge L. Edward Friend II ruled that Ohio-based ISG could purchase Weirton Steel, a steel company with 3,000 employees for $237 million. By court order, the assets were then auctioned with most being acquired by ISG. ISG formed a new division called ISG Weirton Steel.

In April 2005, WL Ross & Company sold International Steel Group—which by then was a Fortune 500 company and had acquired Bethlehem Steel, Weirton Steel, Youngstown Sheet and Tube, Republican Steel, and LTV Steel"— to Mittal for $4.5 billion, half in cash and half in stock. Mittal merged with the "International Steel Group (ISG) which had acquired Bethlehem Steel, Weirton Steel, Youngstown Sheet and Tube, Republican Steel, and LTV Steel in 2004." Mittall's American subsidiary Mittall American Steel which was formed in April, 2005. The largest foreign company to acquire American steel companies is Luxembourg-based Mittal Steel which has been acquiring and merging with companies since 1989 under the tenure of President and CEO, Lakshmi Mittall. On February 25, 2005, Reuters reported that Mittal Steel, planned on cutting up to 45,000 jobs from 2005 to 2010. In 2006, Mittal Steel completed a merger with Arcelor thus resulting in a new company known as ArcelorMittal.

== Textile industry ==
=== International Textile Group (ITG) ===
WL Ross & Co acquired Ross combines bankrupt Greensboro, North Carolina–based textile, companies Burlington Industries and Cone Mills, to create the International Textile Group. WL Ross & Co acquired Burlington Industries in November 2003, for about $614 million, making it a privately held company. In 2004, WL Ross was acquiring the assets of the bankrupt Cone Mills Corp. for $90 million. In 2016 WL Ross & Co sold to the International Textile Group to the private equity firm Platinum Equity in 2016. The Cone Denim mills were shut down by December 31, 2017.

According to a 2005 Forbes article, Ross lobbied for "what became the Central American Free Trade Agreement, which cut 16 cents out of every dollar of apparel and textiles sent to the U.S."

== Invesco (2006-) ==
Since 2006, when Invesco (then Amvescap) acquired the company, WL Ross & Co has been operating as a subsidiary of Invesco. Invesco is an investment management company headquartered in Atlanta, Georgia. Invesco also operates under the Invesco, Trimark, Invesco Perpetual, WL Ross and Powershares brand names. Invesco has grown partially through WL Ross & Co.'s restructuring. Upon completion of the merger the company adopted the name Amvescap.

== Navigator Gas ==
According to Bloomberg Businessweek, by January 2016, WL Ross & Co. was the "biggest investor" in Navigator Holdings, a company that ships liquefied gas. In an agreement between Navigator Holdings and WL Ross & Co "common shares to the value of $75,000,000" were issued on February 25, 2013. Since November 5, 2013, WLR Group—WL Ross & Co and its affiliated investment funds that own stakes in Navigator—have had the right to have two designated members on Navigator Holdings's board of directors. Ross himself was the chairman of the board of Navigator Holdings Ltd.

Although he is no longer on the board of directors of Navigator, Ross has retained investments in Navigator Holdings.

According to a November 7, 2017, article by the Center for Public Integrity (CPI), the Commerce Secretary Ross was divesting his stakes in Diamond S Shipping Group Inc. and Navigator Gas LLC. The CPI published the results of their investigation into the potential for conflict of interest into Ross' stake in Diamond S Shipping, "one of the world's largest owners and operators of medium-range tanker vessels", on March 23, 2017. The CPI March report acknowledged that Diamond S Shipping only represented a "small part of Ross' wealth". Diamond S Shipping's tankers fly under Chinese, Marshall Islands and Malta flags as US workers in the shipping industry demand higher wages. The company's headquarters are in Greenwich, Connecticut. Using a map with data provided by MarineTraffic, CPI revealed how Diamond S Shipping vessels were operating in "countries Trump has singled out, along with scores of other countries that will be affected by the US trade policy Ross is shaping." For example, Diamond S Shipping made "more than 100 visits to China since 2012."

In April 2017, Ross played an influential role in the U.S.-China bilateral trade agreement that was made following U.S. President Trump's meeting with CCP General Secretary Xi Jinping on trade policy issues. The agreement allowed "U.S. companies to ship liquefied natural gas to China" At the White House Commerce Secretary Wilbur Ross told reporters, that this was a "herculean accomplishment...This is more than has been done in the whole history of U.S.-China relations on trade. Normally trade deals are denominated in multiple years, not tens of days." The bilateral agreement "welcome[s] Chinese companies negotiating agreements to purchase U.S.-produced liquefied natural gas." According to the Commerce department by mid-May, the DOJ" had "already authorized the shipment of 19.2 billion cubic feet per day of natural gas exports to China and other interested countries."

In an in depth November 6, 2017, report by American Public Media (ABM), concerns were raised about conflict of interests regarding Wendy Teramoto, who has been with WL Ross & Co since its inception in the 2000s, and who was a board member of Navigator as well as Ross' chief of staff at the Commerce Department.

== Lawsuits and legal challenges ==
In August 2016, faced with Securities and Exchange Commission (SEC) charges that WL Ross & Co. had overcharged fees to their investors, Ross reimbursed investors $11.8 million and paid a fine of $2.3 million. The company denied any liability.
