= List of ports in the Democratic Republic of the Congo =

This list of Ports and harbours in the Democratic Republic of Congo details the ports, harbours around the coast of the Democratic Republic of Congo.

== List of ports and harbours in the Democratic Republic of Congo ==
Port/Harbour name	Province	Town name	Coordinates	UN/Locode	Remarks
Port of Matadi	Kongo Central	Matadi	5°59′S 13°27′E	CDMAT	Medium-sized port. The maximum draft of the port is 8.2m, according to MarineTraffic ― 7.6m.
Port of Banana	Kongo Central	Banana	5°59′S 12°23′E	CDBNW	Medium-sized port. The maximum draft of the port is 8.3m. The port is situated in Banana Creek, an inlet about 1 km wide on the north bank of the Congo River's mouth.
Port of Boma	Kongo Central	Boma	5°51′S 13°3′E	CDBOA	Medium-sized port. The maximum draft of the port is 6.7m. The second-largest port of the country, after Matadi.
