= Diamond S Shipping Group Inc. =

Shipping company

Diamond S Shipping Group Inc
- Traded as: NYSE: DSSI; Russell 2000 Index component
- Founded: 2007
- Headquarters: 33 Benedict Place, Greenwich, CT 06830, Greenwich, Connecticut, United States, United States
- Key people: Panagogiannopoulos I. Nikolaos (President), Craig Stevenson, Jr. (CEO); Florence Ioannou (CFO) of ICR, Inc. Michael Fogarty VP
- Services: Chartering strategy, Medium-range (MR) product tankers
- Number of employees: 29
- Subsidiaries: DSS Vessel II LLC, Diamond S Shipping III LLC, and Diamond S Management LLC
- Website: www.diamondsshipping.com
- Footnotes; 203-413-2000

Diamond S Shipping Group Inc. (DSG) is a shipping company legally incorporated in the Marshall Islands with headquarters in Greenwich, Connecticut, United States that owns and operates medium-range (MR) tanker vessels engaged in the international transoceanic shipping market of refined petroleum and other products. Diamond S Shipping "runs 33 product tankers." Diamond S Shipping Group Inc is traded on the New York Stock Exchange with the symbol.(NYSE:DSSI).

== History ==
Diamond S Shipping is legally incorporated in the Marshall Islands.

== Subsidiaries ==
Diamond S Shipping's subsidiaries include DSS Vessel II LLC, Diamond S Shipping III LLC, and Diamond S Management LLC. The parent or holding company is Diamond S Shipping Group Inc.,"one of the world’s largest owners and operators of medium-range tanker vessels, which crisscross the globe as crucial cogs in the transoceanic shipping trade."

== Services ==
Diamond S Shipping "runs 33 product tankers that move refined petroleum and other products." Most of the 33 vessels ships are "chartered to companies for years at a time." Diamond S Shipping operates in ports in China and other parts of Asia.

== Shareholders ==
Shareholders include First Reserve Corporation, a private equity company based in Greenwich, Connecticut and Cargill's investment arm CarVal. WL Ross & Co affiliates have also been major investors.

== WL Ross & Co ==
Commerce Secretary Wilbur Ross had part ownership of Diamond S Shipping. until the news media coverage from the release of the Paradise Papers in November 2017 focused attention on conflict of interests concerns between Ross' role in trade policy formulation and his investments in large transoceanic shipping companies. The Commerce Department announced on November 7, 2017 that Commerce Secretary Ross "had fully divested" his stakes in Diamond S Shipping, and Navigator Gas LLC. Concerns were raised about Wendy Teramoto, in an in depth November 6, 2017 report by American Public Media (ABM). " Teramato is Ross' chief of staff at the Commerce Department. The APM Reports investigation found that Teramoto, "cut the China trade deal despite serving as a director for Navigator Holdings Ltd."

== Board of directors ==
Craig Stevenson, Jr. is the CEO of Diamond S Shipping. Wilbur Ross was on the management team of Diamond S Shipping until he was appointed U. S. Secretary of Commerce in February 2017. According to a March 23, 2017 article by the Center for Public Integrity, while he stepped down from any decision-making at Diamond S Shipping to avoid conflict-of-interest concerns, Ross kept his "stake in Diamond S Shipping Group Inc."
