= Indemnity =

Contractual obligation to compensate for losses incurred by the other party

In contract law, an indemnity is a contractual obligation of one party (the indemnitor) to compensate the loss incurred by another party (the indemnitee) due to the relevant acts of the indemnitor or any other party. The duty to indemnify is usually, but not always, coextensive with the contractual duty to "hold harmless" or "save harmless". In contrast, a "guarantee" is an obligation of one party (the guarantor) to another party to perform the promise of a relevant other party if that other party defaults.

Indemnities form the basis of many insurance contracts; for example, a car owner may purchase different kinds of insurance as an indemnity for various kinds of loss arising from operation of the car, such as damage to the car itself, or medical expenses following an accident. In an agency context, a principal may be obligated to indemnify their agent for liabilities incurred while carrying out responsibilities under the relationship. While the events giving rise to an indemnity may be specified by contract, the actions that must be taken to compensate the injured party are largely unpredictable, and the maximum compensation is often expressly limited.

== English common law ==
=== Indemnity clauses ===
Under section 4 of the Statute of Frauds (1677), a "guarantee" (an undertaking of secondary liability; to answer for another's default) must be evidenced in writing. No such formal requirement exists in respect of indemnities (involving the assumption of primary liability; to pay irrespective of another's default) which are enforceable even if made orally.

Under current English law, indemnities must be clearly and precisely worded in the contract in order to be enforceable. The Unfair Contract Terms Act 1977 stated that a consumer cannot be made to unreasonably indemnify another for their breach of contract or negligence, though this section was replaced by section 65 of the Consumer Rights Act 2015.

=== Contract award ===
In England and Wales an "indemnity" monetary award may form part of rescission during an action of restitutio in integrum. The property and funds are exchanged, but indemnity may be granted for costs necessarily incurred to the innocent party pursuant to the contract. The leading case is Whittington v Seale-Hayne, in which a contaminated farm was sold. The contract made the buyers renovate the real estate and, the contamination incurred medical expenses for their manager, who had fallen ill. Once the contract was rescinded, the buyer could be indemnified for the cost of renovation as this was necessary to the contract, but not the medical expenses as the contract did not require them to hire a manager. Were the sellers at fault, damages would clearly be available.

The distinction between indemnity and damages is subtle and may be differentiated by considering the roots of the law of obligations: how can money be paid if the defendant is not at fault? The contract before rescission is voidable but not void, so, for a period of time, there is a legal contract. During that time, both parties have legal obligation. If the contract is to be voided ab initio the obligations performed must also be compensated. Therefore, the costs of indemnity arise from the (transient and performed) obligations of the claimant rather than a breach of obligation by the defendant.

=== Distinction from guarantees ===
An indemnity is distinct from a guarantee, which is the promise of a third party to honor the obligation of a party to a contract should that party be unable or unwilling to do so (usually a guarantee is limited to an obligation to pay a debt). This distinction between indemnity and guarantee was discussed as early as the eighteenth century in Birkmyr v Darnell. In that case, concerned with a guarantee of payment for goods rather than payment of rent, the presiding judge explained that a guarantee effectively says "Let him have the goods; if he does not pay you, I will."

=== Distinction from warranties ===
An indemnity is distinct from a warranty in that:

- An indemnity guarantees compensation equal to the amount of loss subject to the indemnity, while a warranty only guarantees compensation for the reduction in value of the acquired asset due to the warranted fact being untrue (and the beneficiary must prove such diminution in value).
- Warranties require the beneficiary to mitigate their losses, while indemnities do not.
- Warranties do not cover problems known to the beneficiary at the time the warranty is given, while indemnities do.

== United States contracts ==
Many private contracts and terms of service in the United States require one party (indemnitor, typically a customer) to pay (indemnify) the other side's costs for legal claims arising from the relationship. They are particularly common in online services.

The US government publishes special Terms of Service, which it has negotiated with many companies, to exclude indemnification for official US government work. US law "is violated by any indemnification agreement that, without statutory authorization, imposes on the United States an open-ended, potentially unrestricted liability." The Attorney General says federal agencies "should renegotiate the terms of service to revise or eliminate the indemnification clause or cancel the [government]'s enrollments in social media applications when their operators insist on such a clause."

=== State variations ===
Under US law, interpretation of indemnification clauses varies by state. For example, in California indemnification clauses do not cover certain risks unless the risks are listed in the contract, but in New York, the brief clause, "X shall defend and indemnify Y for all claims arising from the Product" makes X responsible for all claims against Y. Indemnity can be extremely costly since X's liability insurance typically does not cover claims against Y, but X still has to cover them.

In 2017, the Utah Supreme Court stated, "By statute, a contractual provision requiring a purchaser of a product to indemnify a manufacturer is 'void and unenforceable' in certain circumstances. Utah Code § 78B-6-707."

In 2012–2014, a New Jersey woman had to pay a lawyer to get out of an indemnity payment for injury at a storage unit. When someone slipped on ice in 2012 while going to a unit, Public Storage sued in court to make the woman who rented the unit pay for the injury. She tried to ignore the case and so state court ruled that she had to pay. She then retained a lawyer and went to court. In 2014, the US District Court decided that the specific indemnity clause was unenforceable in New Jersey because it covered Public Storage's own negligence without explicitly saying so, contrary to New Jersey law (other states differ). A 2013 decision in New Jersey upheld a broad indemnity clause since it was followed by another sentence: "indemnity agreement is intended to be as broad and inclusive as is permitted by the law of the State of New Jersey." The judge said, "It is true that a consumer, unfamiliar with the laws of New Jersey, would not be able to state with certainty how far the waiver extends."

In 2010, the Colorado Supreme Court required a flower shop to indemnify its shopping center for a customer who slipped on the icy parking lot, though of no fault of the flower shop, because the tenant was there to visit that shop, and the shop's lease had a broad indemnity clause.

In 1999, the United States District Court for the District of Wyoming did not require a customer to indemnify a whitewater rafting company for injury to his wife since the wording may have applied only to him and his children, and clauses cannot be enforced in Wyoming to indemnify a company for its own negligence.

In 1979, the Minnesota Supreme Court ruled that a subcontractor must indemnify the builder for damages that it caused, according to an indemnification clause in their purchase order.

In 1966, the Supreme Court of California ruled that The Hertz Corporation could not enforce its clause requiring renters to indemnify Hertz's insurer.

=== With negotiations ===
Indemnities can be expensive enough to bankrupt a company that pays them: "If manufacturers ... are to survive, they will need liability insurance, as well as favorable contracts with retailers. If you look at a big retailers, such as Trader Joe's or Costco or Walmart or Randalls, very often there will be an indemnity provision providing that, if you want to sell a product in our stores, and if it gets someone sick or if it has to be recalled, and it's your fault, you must pay us back for that."

When a contract is "negotiable," the indemnitor negotiates to control those legal costs. It will not let the indemnified party (indemnitee) overspend: "An arrangement in which the indemnitee makes decisions about how to defend and settle the claim while the indemnitor writes the checks presents a moral hazard. Knowing that its defense and settlement costs are being borne by the indemnitor, the indemnitee may be encouraged to engage a more expensive legal team or pursue a riskier defense strategy than it would otherwise. For this reason, most indemnitors are unwilling to indemnify against claims when they do not control the defense of the claim."

The American Bar Association has published advice on negotiations of construction contracts: that (1) owners try to get contractors to indemnify as much as possible and for (2) contractors (a) indemnify only for their own negligence and (b) "establish a right but not a duty for the contractor to defend under an indemnification claim."

An example of letting the indemnitor control costs is in the case of a contractor for a homeowners' association (HOA) in which "Contractor shall indemnify, defend (by counsel reasonably acceptable to Association) and hold harmless the Association." Companies and HOAs also use indemnity to protect directors since few would serve as directors if their risks were not indemnified. Negotiation is important for both parties. "Just about all homeowner association management contracts have a provision which states that the HOA shall indemnify the manager under certain circumstances ... There are several ways the indemnification clause can be drafted and both management and HOA must take into account what protects each the best."

If indemnitors can negotiate a limit on liability in their contract, that limits the cost of a potential indemnity if they "make clear in the agreement that any limitations of liability (whether in the form of caps or exclusions of certain types of damages – e.g., consequential) apply to the ... indemnification."

=== Without negotiations ===
When a contract is not negotiable (adhesion contract), the wording often lets the indemnitee decide what to spend on legal costs and bill the indemnitor. Most clauses are quite broad. The following are examples of indemnity requirements from a range of businesses. The last one, Angie's List, limits issues to the user's fault, but decisions and costs are still controlled by the indemnitee (Angie's List).

- "The yacht owner shall indemnify, defend, and hold harmless the marina from any costs, expenses, damages, and against all claims, demands, loss, lawsuits, including judgments and attorney fees for damages to property, injury or life to third parties resulting or arising from the yacht owner's use of the yacht." The lawyer for a boat owners' group interpreted that as meaning: "By signing a marina contract with such provisions, you may find yourself responsible for costs not covered by your insurance policy ... What it means is that if your guest is injured at the marina, even if it's the marina's fault, you agree that you will defend the marina against the claim and pay any damages for which the marina is deemed responsible."
- "You agree to indemnify and hold Uber ... harmless from any and all claims ... in connection with: (i) your use of the Services ..."
- "Occupant shall indemnify and hold Owner [Public Storage] and Owner's Agents harmless from any loss incurred by Owner and Owner's Agents in any way arising out of Occupant's use of the Premises or the Property including, but not limited to, claims of injury or loss by Occupant's visitors or invitees."
- "You agree to defend, hold harmless and indemnify edX [founded by Harvard and MIT] ... against any third-party claims ... in any way related to your use of the Site ..."
- "You agree that you will indemnify and hold harmless NPR ... from any and all claims ... arising from ... (2) your use of the NPR Services, (3) the User Materials you have Submitted on or through the NPR Services, or (4) NPR's publication, distribution or use of such User Materials ..."
- "If you are using our Services on behalf of a business, that business accepts these terms. It will hold harmless and indemnify Google ... from any claim, action or proceedings arising from or related to the use of the Services ..."
- "Upon request by Bank of America or its Affiliates, you agree to defend, indemnify and hold harmless Bank of America ... from all liabilities, claims and expenses, including attorneys fees, that arise from ... third party claims arising from your use of the Sites. Bank of America and its Affiliates reserve the right to assume the exclusive defense and control of any matter otherwise subject to indemnification by you. Notwithstanding the foregoing, you are not required to indemnify Bank of America or its Affiliates for its own violations of applicable laws."
- "You agree to indemnify, defend and hold harmless Verizon Parties from and against all losses ... related to claims made by any third-party due to or arising out of (a) Submitted Material ... (b) your use of the Sites or Resources ... Verizon reserves the right to assume the defense and control of any matter subject to indemnification by you, in which event you will cooperate with Verizon in asserting any available defenses."
- "You agree to indemnify, defend and hold harmless Angie's List ... against all losses ... arising from: (a) any violation of this Agreement by You; (b) the inaccurate or untruthful Content or other information provided by You to Angie's List or that You submit, transmit or otherwise make available through the Service; or (c) any intentional or willful violation of any rights of another or harm You may have caused to another. Angie's List will have sole control of the defense of any such damage or claim."

== Insurance ==
Indemnity insurance compensates the beneficiaries of the policies for their actual economic losses, up to the limiting amount of the insurance policy. It generally requires the insured to prove the amount of its loss before it can recover. Recovery is limited to the amount of the provable loss even if the face amount of the policy is higher. This is in contrast to, for example, life insurance, where the amount of the beneficiary's economic loss is irrelevant. The death of the person whose life is insured for reasons not excluded from the policy obligate the insurer to pay the entire policy amount to the beneficiary.

Most business interruption insurance policies contain an Extended Period of Indemnity Endorsement, which extends coverage beyond the time that it takes to physically restore the property. This provision covers additional expenses that allow the business to return to prosperity and help the business restore revenues to pre-loss levels.

== Indemnity agreement for board members ==
As part of the appointment of officers, the board will often approve indemnification agreements with the officer. Such agreements provide for indemnification of officers for personal liability for actions taken on behalf of the corporation. The board will also approve separate resolutions that approve indemnification for decisions made by directors. Indemnity agreements are included in the post-incorporation processes of companies.

== Historical examples ==
=== Freeing of slaves and indentured servants ===
Slave owners were considered to have suffered a loss whenever their slaves were granted their freedom.

When the slaves of Zanzibar were freed in 1897, it was by compensation since the prevailing opinion was that the slave owners suffered the loss of an asset whenever a slave was freed.

In the 1860s in the United States, U.S. President Abraham Lincoln had requested many millions of dollars from Congress with which to compensate slave owners for the loss of their slaves. On 9 July 1868, Section IV of the Fourteenth Amendment dismissed all of the claims that slave owners had been injured by the freeing of the slaves.

In 1807–1808, in Prussia, statesman Baron Heinrich vom Stein introduced a series of reforms, the principal of which was the abolition of serfdom with indemnification to territorial lords.

Haiti was required to pay an indemnity of 150,000,000 francs to France in order to atone for the loss suffered by the French slave owners.

In Peru, Antonio Salinas y Castañeda (1810–1874), a wealthy Peruvian landowner and conservative politician, led the meeting of the main landowners of the country for an indemnity after slavery abolition and ruled the commission who promoted the immigration of Asians to replace former slaves as a workforce during Ramón Castilla government.

=== Costs of war ===
The nation that wins a war may insist on being paid compensations for the costs of the war, even after having been the instigator of the war.

- Following the Sino-Japanese War of 1894–1895, the Treaty of Shimonoseki required that China pay Japan the sum of 200,000,000 taels.
- Following the massacres of foreigners during the Boxer Rebellion, the defeated Qing Empire was required to pay 450 million taels of fine silver as indemnity over a course of 39 years to the eight nations involved. Under the exchange rates at the time, this was equal to 335 million US gold dollars or £67 million.

== See also ==
- Double indemnity (insurance)
- Professional indemnity insurance
- Protection and indemnity insurance
- Reparations (transitional justice)
- Legal remedy
- Restitution
- Reparation (legal)
