= Daniel Baker (businessman) =

American businessman

- Occupations: Founder, former CEO of FlightAware

Daniel Baker is an American businessman. Baker is the founder and former CEO of FlightAware, a worldwide flight data and tracking company. In the 1990s, he was a principal of distributed.net, which pioneered Internet distributed computing. Baker was the head of the systems department at NeoSoft, the first Internet provider in Texas during the early 1990s. He was also a founder and Vice President of Superconnect, an enterprise cable/telecom monitoring software company.

== FlightAware ==
In 2005, Baker started FlightAware, an aviation and commercial flight tracking system.He started the company with no outside investments and the business produced over a million dollars of revenue in the first 18 months.

The company was sold to Collins Aerospace in 2021.

== Career ==
Daniel Baker authored for Macmillan Computer Publishing's TCP/IP Unleashed book, published in 1999.

He was also the founder of the I Travel, You Travel community and network, which was sold to a social networking company for an undisclosed sum in 2006.

Baker is a member of the board of directors of the General Aviation Manufacturers Association, the Smithsonian Institution's National Air and Space Museum, the National Business Aviation Association, and Aspen Public Radio.

== Honors and awards ==
In 2023, Baker was inducted into the Texas Aviation Hall of Fame.

== Personal ==
Baker is a commercial pilot and flight instructor and lives in Montecito, California with his daughter, and wife.
