= Flightradar24 =

Flight tracking online service

- Website type: Aircraft tracking
- Available in: English
- Headquarters: Stockholm, Sweden
- Country of origin: Sweden
- Owner: Flightradar24 AB
- Revenue: 418.8 million SEK (2024)
- Website: flightradar24.com
- Commercial: Partially
- Registration: Freemium
- Launched: 2006; 20 years ago
- Current status: Active

Flightradar24 is a Swedish Internet-based service that shows real-time aircraft flight tracking information on a map. It includes flight tracking information, origins and destinations, flight numbers, aircraft types, positions, altitudes, headings and speeds. It can also show time-lapse replays of previous tracks and historical flight data by airline, aircraft, aircraft type, area, or airport. It aggregates data from multiple sources, but, outside of the United States, mostly from crowdsourced information gathered by volunteers with ADS-B receivers and from satellite-based ADS-B receivers.

The service is available via a web page or mobile device apps. The Guardian considers the site to be "authoritative".

It is the largest ADS-B network in the world with more than 40,000 connected receivers, more than 200,000 flights tracked per day, and more than 4 million users per day. It is also used by most major airlines and others in the aviation industry, including Airbus, Boeing, and Embraer.

== History ==
=== Launching of the website ===
The service was founded by two Swedish aviation enthusiasts in 2006 as Flygbilligt.com and later Flygradar.nu for Northern and Central Europe. The service was opened in 2009, allowing anyone with a suitable ADS-B receiver to contribute data.

=== Events ===
The service received extensive exposure in 2010, when international media relied on it to describe the flight disruption over the North Atlantic and Europe caused by the Eyjafjallajökull volcano eruptions. Flightradar24 came at the turn of the month July–August 2010 as an iOS application and September 15 of the same year on Android.

In 2014, it was used by multiple major news outlets following several high-profile crashes: in March after the disappearance of Malaysia Airlines Flight 370, in July after Malaysia Airlines Flight 17 was shot down over Ukraine, and in December when Indonesia AirAsia Flight 8501 went missing.

In August 2015, Flightradar24 acquired the aviation photography catalog JetPhotos, using its catalog to supply images of aircraft tracked on the site. As of September 2025, JetPhotos contains more than 6 million user-contributed images and data on more than 40,000 individual aircraft types.

In November 2015, The Guardian newspaper reported that Metrojet Flight 9268, an Airbus A321-231 en route to Saint Petersburg from Sharm el-Sheikh International Airport had broken up in the air based on information available from Flightradar24.

From 3 March 2020, ADS-B data collected by satellite was made available to all users. Aircraft located using satellite data are coloured blue on the map, and yellow if located by terrestrial receivers.

In February 2022, during the Russian invasion of Ukraine, the website crashed due to an influx of visitors tracking flights in and around Ukraine. In August 2022, the plane carrying Nancy Pelosi to Taiwan, SPAR19, was tracked by more than 708,000 people as it landed in Taipei, with more than 2.9 million people following at least a portion of the flight.

In September 2022, the plane carrying the coffin of Queen Elizabeth II was attempted to be tracked by 6,000,000 users in the first minute after the transponder activated, with 4,790,000 following a portion of the flight, becoming the most tracked flight of all time. The website processed 76,200,000 requests related to the flight over its course. Initially, the site crashed due to the sheer number of users.

On 25 August 2025, a routine Aurigny flight operated by an ATR 72 somehow became number one tracked in the world and was tracked by 1.3 million users. Flightradar confirmed the numbers were real, and there is still no explanation on why this had happened.

=== Santa Tracker ===
Every Christmas Eve, Flightradar24 displays its "Santa Tracker", allowing users to follow a simulated journey of Santa Claus as he "delivers" presents worldwide, similar to NORAD Tracks Santa. This feature uses the platform's flight-tracking interface to display the journey of Santa's sleigh on a virtual map, complete with animated visuals and real-time updates, as if its flight was a reality.

=== April fools joke ===
On April 1, 2025, Flightradar24 made an April fools joke by recreating two Concorde flights, one from London to New York City and another from Paris to New York, to trick people into thinking that the Concorde was flying again. In reality, this was not the case, as the Concorde has been retired since 2003. More than 50,000 people were tracking the flight, and it generated significant attention, including comments on a post on Flightradar’s official X account that received 21,000 likes and more than 1 million views.

== Tracking ==
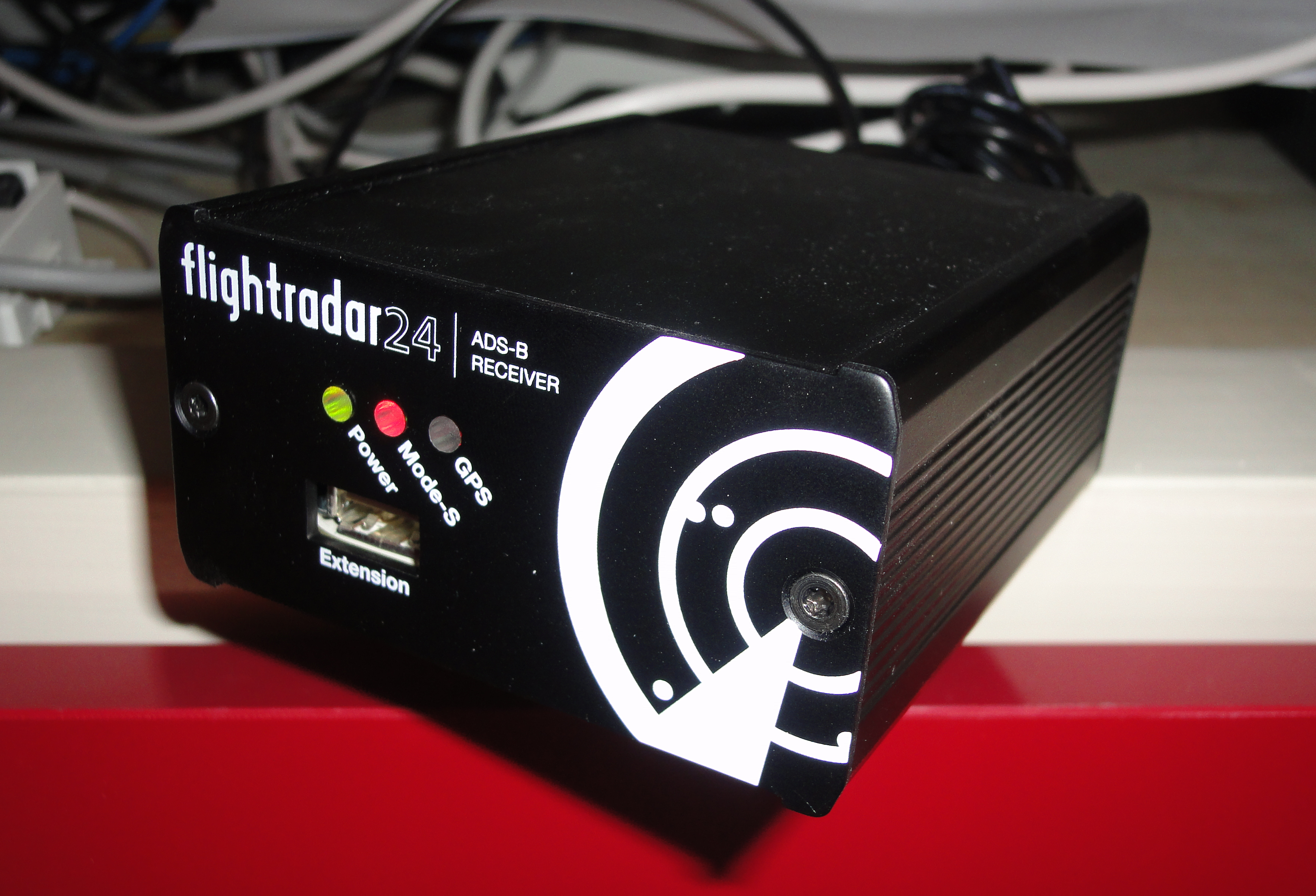
Flightradar24 ADS-B receiver based on jetvision Radarcape

Flightradar24 aggregates data from six sources:

1. Automatic dependent surveillance – broadcast (ADS-B). The principal source is a large number of ground-based ADS-B receivers, which collect data from any aircraft in their local area that are equipped with an ADS-B transponder and feed this data to the internet in real time. The aircraft-based transponders use the GPS and other flight data input to transmit signals containing aircraft registration, position, altitude, velocity and other flight data. As of 2019, about 80% of aircraft in Europe are equipped with ADS-B and 60% in the US. Airbus aircraft are ADS-B equipped but Boeing 707, 717, 727, 737-200, 747-100, 747-200, and 747SPs do not come equipped and are not generally visible unless retrofitted by their operators. Typical ADS-B receivers include Kinetic Avionic's SBS-1 and AirNav-systems's AirNav. These receivers are run by volunteers, mostly aviation enthusiasts. ADS-B signals can also be received and uploaded by a low-cost Software-defined radio. As of 2023, Flightradar24 has the largest ADS-B network in the world with more than 40,000 connected receivers.
2. Multilateration (MLAT): The second major source is multilateration using Flightradar24 receivers. All aircraft types will be visible in areas covered by MLAT, even without ADS-B, but while 99% of Europe is covered, only parts of the US are. At least four receivers are needed to calculate the position of an aircraft.
3. Satellite: Satellites equipped with ADS-B receivers collect data from aircraft outside of Flightradar24's terrestrial ADS-B network coverage area and send that data to the Flightradar24 network.
4. US/Canada/Australia radar data: This data source is used for filling in coverage across oceanic territory controlled by these nations. It is also used for weather related data.
5. FLARM: A simpler version of ADS-B with a shorter range, primarily used by smaller aircraft, in most cases, gliders. The range of a FLARM receiver is between 20 and 100 kilometres (12 and 62 mi; 11 and 54 nmi).
6. Federal Aviation Administration: The shortfall in the US is mostly made up of five minute delayed data from the Federal Aviation Administration (FAA) but this may not include aircraft registration and other information.

== Privacy ==
The site blocks some ADS-B information from display for "security and privacy" purposes, using the FAA initiative LADD (Limited Aircraft Data Displayed) and other programs. For instance, the position of the Japanese Air Force One aircraft used by the Japanese emperor and prime minister was visible on the site until August 2014, when the Japanese Ministry of Defense requested that the information be blocked. Some aircraft can be found with low resolution images in place (due to reasons of privacy), showing the aircraft's art. This has subsequently meant that the aircraft no longer has its flight track posted online or on the site.

== See also ==
- FlightAware
- Plane Finder
- MarineTraffic
- AirNav Systems
