= Borland's Trustee v Steel Bros & Co Ltd =

Borland's Trustee v Steel Brothers & Co Ltd
- Court: High Court
- Citation: [1901] 1 Ch 279

Court membership
- Judge sitting: Farwell J

Keywords
- Share, company constitution

Borland's Trustee v Steel Brothers & Co Ltd [1901] 1 Ch 279 is a UK company law case, concerning the enforceability of a company's constitution and the nature of a company share. It is also one of the rare exceptions to the rule that a transfer of assets which only takes effect upon a person's bankruptcy is normally void.

== Facts ==
Steel Bros Ltd's articles of association said if a member went bankrupt his shares would be transferred to designated persons at a fair price not above par value. Mr JE Borland held 73 £100 shares and went bankrupt, and so the company gave Borland's trustee in bankruptcy notice of the transfer. The trustee argued the article was void because it compromised ownership and property rights which tended to perpetuity, against the rule against perpetuities. It requested an injunction against the share transfer at all, or at anything less than a fair value

== Judgment ==
Farwell J rejected Borland Trustee's argument and held the article was valid. The transfer could be made, because the contract engendered in the articles of association are prior to the rights contained in a share. He said the argument that the article was repugnant to absolute ownership needed to assert, wrongly, that a share is a sum of money dealt with by executory limitations. But in fact a share is an interest and consists of 'a series of mutual covenants entered into by all the shareholders inter se in accordance with section 16 of the Companies Act 1862.' The argument about perpetuity has no application because the rule against perpetuities does not apply to personal contracts.

It is said that the provisions of these articles compel a man at any time during the continuance of this company to sell his shares to particular persons at a particular price to be ascertained in the manner prescribed in the articles. Two arguments have been founded on that. It is said, first of all, that such provisions are repugnant to absolute ownership. It is said, further, that they tend to perpetuity. They are likened to the case of a settlor or testator who settles or gives a sum of money subject to executory limitations which are to arise in the future, interpreting the articles as if they provided that if at any time hereafter, during centuries to come, the company should desire the shares of a particular person, not being a manager or assistant, he must sell them. To my mind that is applying to company law a principle which is wholly inapplicable thereto. It is the first time that any such suggestion has been made, and it rests, I think, on a misconception of what a share in a company really is. A share, according to the plaintiff's argument, is a sum of money which is dealt with in a particular manner by what are called for the purpose of argument executory limitations. To my mind it is nothing of the sort. A share is the interest of a shareholder in the company measured by a sum of money, for the purpose of liability in the first place, and of interest in the second, but also consisting of a series of mutual covenants entered into by all the shareholders inter se in accordance with s 16 of the Companies Act 1862. The contract contained in the articles of association is one of the original incidents of the share. A share is not a sum of money settled in the way suggested, but is an interest measured by a sum of money and made up of various rights contained in the contract, including the right to a sum of money of a more or less amount. That view seems to me to be supported by the authority of New London and Brazilian Bank v Brocklebank. That was a case in which trustees bought shares in a company whose articles provided "that the company should have a first and paramount charge on the shares of any shareholder for all moneys owing to the company from him alone or jointly with any other person, and that when a share was held by more persons than one the company should have a like lien and charge thereon in respect of all moneys so owing to them from all or any of the holders thereof alone or jointly with any other person." One of the trustees was a partner in a firm which afterwards went into liquidation, at a time at which it owed the company a debt which had arisen long after the registration of the shares in the names of the trustees. It was held that the shares were subject to the lien mentioned for the benefit of the company, notwithstanding the interest of the cestuis que trust which was said to be paramount. If there had been any substance in the suggestion now made, namely, that the right to the lien was the right to an executory lien arising from time to time as the necessity for it arose, it might have been put forward in that case; but the decision was based on a ground inconsistent with any such contention, namely, that the shares were subjected to this particular lien in their inception and as one of their incidents. Jessel M.R. likened it to the case of a lease. Holker L.J. said:

"It seems to me that the shares having been purchased on those terms and conditions, it is impossible for the cestuis que trust to say that those terms and conditions are not to be observed."

Then it is said that this is contrary to the rule against perpetuity. Now, in my opinion the rule against perpetuity has no application whatever to personal contracts. If authority is necessary for that, the case of Witham v Vane is a direct authority of the House of Lords; and to my mind an even stronger case is that of Walsh v Secretary of State for India. A stronger instance of the unlimited extent of personal liability could hardly be cited; the Old East India Company in 1760, or thereabouts, entered into a covenant with the first Lord Clive, that in the event of the company ceasing to be the possessors of the Bengal territories they would repay to Lord Clive, his executors or administrators, a sum of about eight lacs of rupees, which had been transferred to them for certain particular purposes. The actual event did not happen till nearly a century later; and, as Lord Selborne pointed out in Witham v Vane, the question of perpetuity was put forward tentatively in argument in the House of Lords; but Lord Cairns with his usual discretion did not press it.

...the trustee is as much bound by these personal obligations of the bankrupt as the bankrupt himself, if he were not bankrupt, would be.

== Cambridge Gas ==
The case was cited with approval in the decision of the Privy Council in the leading case of Cambridge Gas Transport Corp v Official Committee of Unsecured Creditors (of Navigator Holdings Plc and Others) [2006] UKPC 26, [2007] 1 AC 508.

== See also ==
- UK company law
- Capacity in English law
- Agency in English law
- Navigator Gas LLC
