= George Farwell (judge) =

English judge (1845–1915)

The Right Honourable Sir George Farwell
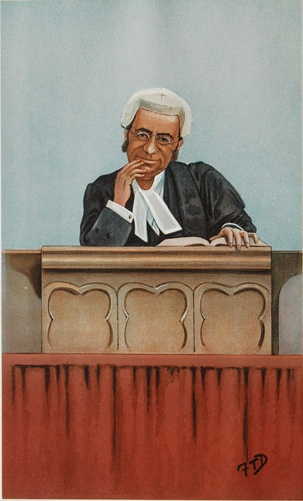
- Mr Justice Farwell in 1900

Lord Justice of Appeal
- In office 11 June 1906 – 30 May 1913

Justice of the High Court
- In office 23 October 1899 – 11 June 1906

Personal details
- Born: George Farwell; 22 December 1845 Codsall, Staffordshire
- Died: 30 September 1915 (aged 69) Timberscombe, Somerset
- Spouse: Mary Erskine Wickens (m. 1873)
- Children: 6
- Education: Balliol College, Oxford

Sir George Farwell PC (22 December 1845 – 30 September 1915) was an English judge, noted for trying the Taff Vale case at the first instance.

== Biography ==
Farwell was born in Codsall, Staffordshire, the second son of Frederick Cooper Farwell, agent to the Duke of Cleveland, and of Louisa Whitbread, née Michell, daughter of Admiral Sir Frederick Michell. He was educated at Rugby School and Balliol College, Oxford, where he took first class honours in classical moderations and second class honours in literae humaniores.

He was called to the bar in 1871, he became a QC in 1891, a bencher of Lincoln's Inn in 1895, while in 1899 he was raised to the bench. In 1900 he came into prominence over the case known as the Taff Vale judgment. His decision, though reversed by the court of appeal, was upheld in 1901 by the House of Lords, and ultimately led to the passing of the Trade Disputes Act (1906). In 1906 Farwell was made a Lord of Appeal, but resigned this position in 1913. He published Concise Treatise on the Law of Powers (1874).

His son Sir Christopher John Wickens Farwell was also a High Court Chancery judge.

== Notable Cases ==
- Whittington v Seale-Hayne (1900) 82 LT 49
- Borland’s Trustee v Steel Brothers & Co Ltd [1901] 1 Ch 279
- British South Africa Company v De Beers Consolidated Mines Ltd [1910] 2 Ch 502

== Arms ==
Coat of arms of George Farwell
| Motto Semper Idem |
