= TravelSky =

Chinese technology Company

TravelSky Technology Limited

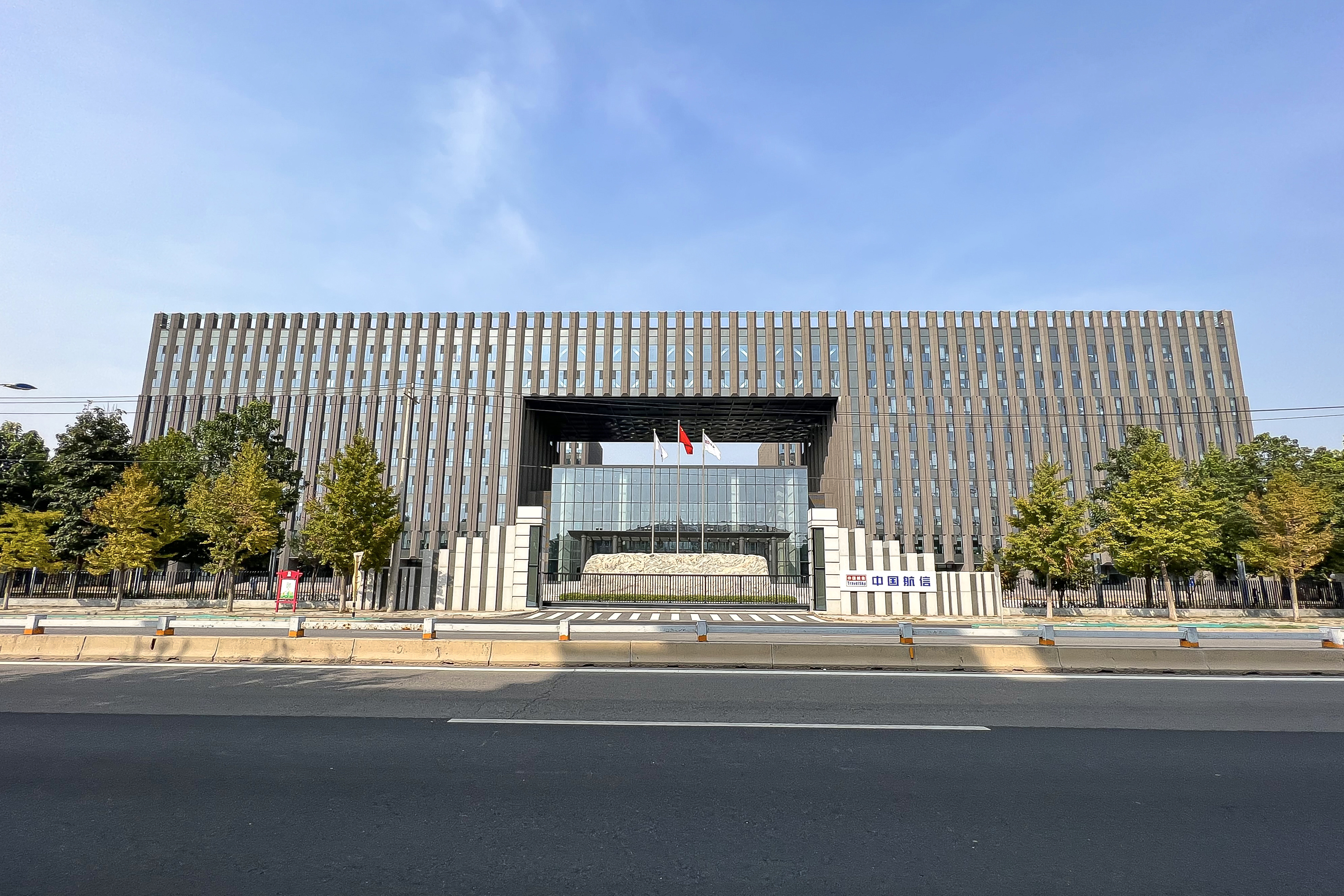
- Company type: Public
- Traded as: SEHK: 696
- Industry: Aviation
- Founded: Listed February 7, 2001
- Headquarters: Beijing, China
- Number of locations: 300 Chinese cities, Hong Kong, Singapore, Japan and South Korea
- Area served: China (primary market)
- Key people: Xu Qiang (Chairman); Cui Zhixiong and Xiao Yinhong (Executive Directors); Wang Quanhua, Luo Chaogeng, Cao Guangfu (Non-Executive Directors); Yik Wing Fat, Simon, Yuan Yaohui, Chua Keng Kim (Independent Non-Executive Directors); Ding Weiping (Company Secretary)
- Services: IT services
- Revenue: ▲940 USD?
- Operating income: ▲ Hong Kong Dollar ?
- Net income: ▲HKD ?
- Total assets: ▲HKD ?
- Total equity: ▲HKD ?
- Number of employees: >4,000 (2012)
- Website: www.travelsky.com.cn

TravelSky Technology Limited is the dominant provider of information technology services to the Chinese air travel and tourism industries. Its clients include airlines, airports, air travel suppliers, travel agencies, individual and corporate travel consumers and cargo services. It is listed on the Hong Kong stock exchange and its majority shareholder or parent group is the China TravelSky Holding Company, a State-owned enterprise (SOE).

== History ==
Originally "a government unit staffed with only dozens of people", the organisation has grown with Chinese aviation reform to represent a group of companies in multiple countries.

== Corporate structure ==
TravelSky Technology Limited was listed on the Hong Kong Stock Exchange in July 2008 with stock code 0696.HK and TSYHY. New York. Its majority shareholder is the China TravelSky Holding Company which itself is a national enterprise under the State-owned Assets Supervision and Administration Commission of the State Council. The core holding is TravelSky Technology Limited. TravelSky Technology Limited is owned by China TravelSky Holding Company.

=== Headquarters ===
TravelSky is headquartered in Beijing, with over 7,255 employees.

=== Subsidiaries ===
TravelSky has 12 branches, 18 subsidiaries (including subsidiaries in Hong Kong, Japan, Singapore and South Korea), 8 affiliated companies.

== Customers ==
The Group's travel service distribution network comprises more than 70,000 sales terminals owned by more than 8,000 travel agencies and travel service distributors, with high-level networking and direct links to all global distribution systems (GDSs) around the world and 137 foreign and regional commercial airlines through SITA networks, covering over 400 domestic and overseas cities. The Group rendered technology support and localized services to travel agencies and travel service distributors through more than 40 local distribution centres across China and 9 overseas distribution centres across Asia, Europe, North America and Australia. The network processed over 422.4 million transactions during 2016 with its transaction amount reaching RMB424.8 billion.

== Services ==
=== AIT ===
TravelSky's aviation information technology (AIT) services are used by 38 commercial airlines in the PRC and more than 350 foreign and regional commercial airlines. They support electronic travel distribution (ETD), including Inventory Control (ICS) and Computer Reservations (CRS), Airport Passenger Processing (APP), airline alliances, e-tickets and e-commerce, decision-making, and ground operational efficiency.

==== Electronic travel Distribution ====
Electronic travel distribution (ETD) services include:

- Inventory Control System (ICS)
- Computer Reservation System (CRS)
- Airport Passenger Processing (APP)

ETD services include data services to support decisions of commercial airlines, product service to support aviation alliance, solutions for developing commercial airlines' e-ticket and e-commerce as well as information management systems to improve ground operational efficiency of commercial airlines and airports.

==== Front-End Development ====
Umetrip (航旅纵横) is a mobile application developed by TravelSKy, providing flight booking, management, and flight tracking information services through its PSS platform.

Other front-end applications developed by TravelSky include airfare search engine SearchOne, airline operation monitoring system SkyOne, information security monitoring system TSM.

== Transaction volume ==
=== 2010 ===
In August 2010, Travelsky processed 27,664,743 bookings on Chinese commercial airlines, and 1,076,297 bookings on foreign and regional commercial airlines.

=== 2009 ===
In August 2009, Travelsky processed 23,615,669 bookings on Chinese commercial airlines, and 841,025 bookings on foreign and regional commercial airlines.

=== 2006 ===
Travelsky's ETD system processed approximately 173.0 million bookings on domestic and overseas commercial airlines in 2006. Electronic tickets sold amounted to approximately 71.6 million segments in 2006 by domestic airlines through the Company's BSP (Billing and Settlement Plan) electronic ticketing, Airline Directsale electronic ticketing and Airline Online electronic ticketing. Electronic tickets amounted to 81.4% of all tickets in 2006, making China the second largest user of electronic tickets in the world, after the United States.

In 2006, the new generation APP (NewAPP) front system developed by the company was further installed in several domestic airports including Beijing Capital Airport and Pudong Airport in Shanghai. As a result, 45 domestic airports are now using the Company's NewAPP front system, which helped establish its leading position at domestic large and medium airports. In 2006, overseas and regional commercial airlines using the company's APP systems increased to 29. Together with those accesses from overseas and regional commercial airlines to the company's multi-host connecting program, a total of 2.4 million passenger departures were processed.

The Group's travel distribution network comprises approximately 58 thousand sales terminals owned by more than 6,500 travel agencies or travel service distributors, with high-level networking and direct links to all GDS around the world and 29 foreign and regional commercial airlines through SITA networks, covering over 400 domestic and overseas cities. The Group rendered technology support and localised services to travel agencies and travel service distributors through more than 30 local distribution centers across China and four overseas distribution centers in Hong Kong, Singapore, Japan and South Korea.

In 2006, the group kept perfecting the hotel distribution system to actively cooperate with the upstream travel product providers and the downstream travel service distributors. Throughout the year, the Company successfully distributed 230.4 thousand hotels' roomnights, representing a year-on-year increase of 4.5 times. In 2006, capturing opportunities airing from the increasing demands for China's aviation information safety, the Group proactively expanded its information technology integration service to promote its business in the field.

On January 1, 2001, InfoSky, the joint venture between the company and SITA, commenced operation. InfoSky introduced and developed a series of creative technical products for air logistics enterprise such as airlines, airport cargo terminals, freight forwarders and logistics service providers. InfoSky offers cargo system services for more than 11 airlines and 15 airports.

The H shares of the company were listed on the Stock Exchange of Hong Kong Limited on February 7, 2001, trade code 0696, and the net proceeds from the issuance of H shares amounted to approximately HK$1.2 billion. After the company was listed, we received much recognition from investors and were ranked 'Best Run' by Hong Kong Exchange.

== Achievements ==
=== 2002 ===
TravelSky was nominated as one of the Deloitte Touche Tohmastsu Technology Fast 500, with the net income increase rate of 38%, TravelSky was ranked 218th in the list.

The United States Securities and Exchange Commission approved the company's Sponsored Level 1 American depositary receipt programme.

=== 2001 ===
In 2001 Forbes recognised TravelSky, along with only seven other listed entities, as one of the 200 best small-scale enterprises in the world.

== Commercial outlook ==
According to its website in 2010, TravelSky is focused on diversification in the travel market, including travel-related rental and hotel reservation.
