= FlightAware =

Software company based in Houston, Texas, US

FlightAware, LLC
- Company type: Subsidiary
- Available in: Multilingual (18)
- Founded: March 17, 2005; 21 years ago
- Headquarters: 11 Greenway Plaza, Houston, Texas
- Country of origin: United States
- Area served: United States and Canada (2004–2008); Worldwide (2008–present)
- Key people: Daniel Baker (CEO); Karl Lehenbauer (CTO)
- Industry: Flight tracking
- Revenue: US$4 million (2009 est.)
- Parent: Collins Aerospace
- Website: flightaware.com
- Commercial: Yes
- Users: Over 12,000,000
- Launched: September 8, 2005; 21 years ago
- Current status: Active

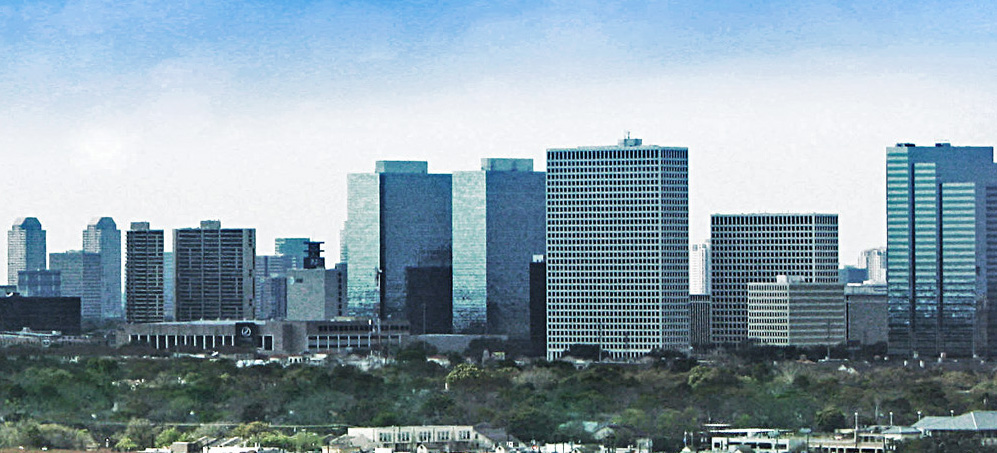
11 Greenway Plaza houses the headquarters of FlightAware.

FlightAware is an American multi-national technology company that provides real-time, historical, and predictive flight tracking data and products. As of 2025, it is one of the world's largest flight tracking platforms, with a network of over 40,000 ADS-B ground stations in 196 countries. FlightAware also provides aviation data and predicted ETAs to airlines, airport operators, and software developers. FlightAware is a subsidiary of Collins Aerospace (itself a subsidiary of Raytheon), with headquarters in 11 Greenway Plaza in Houston, Texas, and sales offices in New York City, Austin (Texas), Singapore, and London.

== History ==
In 2004, CEO Daniel Baker started exploring the idea of creating a free flight tracking service as he wanted a way for his family to track his private flights around the country. At the time, there were few enterprise solutions that offered this kind of service. Baker recruited friends Karl Lehenbauer and David McNett to help create a free public flight tracking service. On March 17, 2005, FlightAware was officially founded and began processing live flight data. It earned over one million dollars in revenue in its first 18 months. FlightAware has been profitable since 2006 and is growing at the rate of 40–50% per year, as of April 2014. On November 16, 2021, Collins Aerospace completed its acquisition of FlightAware.

In October 2023, FlightAware added helicopters to its flight-tracking services. The new service has been given the name, Global for Helicopters.

In August 2024, FlightAware sent to its users an email regarding a data breach of their website. Per FlightAware email, the affected data include passwords and email addresses, and may include their extended data if the user has provided it to the company on their profile. At the time FlightAware has not yet said how many users are affected by it.

== Website ==
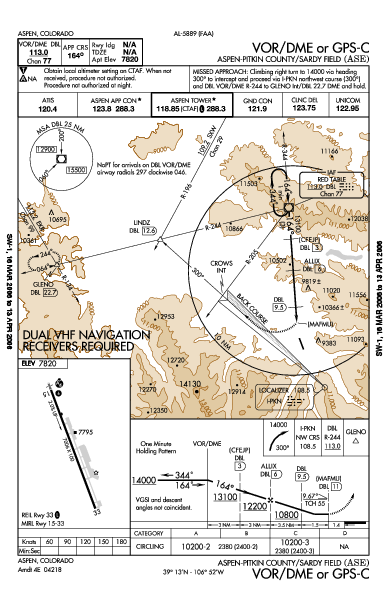
Example of a chart available for download

The company's website provides flight tracking information and notifications of private and commercial flights as well as airport activity, flight and airport maps with weather, aviation statistics, flight planning and instrument flight rules procedures for airports in the United States and Australia. In addition, the site includes pilot services such as flight planning, aviation news, photos, and an aviation discussion forum.

Users can register with the site for free, which adds features and functionality as well as the ability to participate in community features. Registration allows users to upload photos, submit aviation-related news ("squawks"), participate in discussion forums, and set up aircraft alerts in addition to numerous other features. FlightAware reports over ten million registered users.

FlightAware serves over 500 million flight tracking pages to over 12 million users per month as of June 2019.

== Commercial products and services ==
FlightAware provides various paid commercial services designed to support aviation-related businesses, consumers, and FBOs. These services provide a significant portion of FlightAware's revenue.

=== FlightAware Global ===
FlightAware Global makes worldwide flight tracking available for aircraft operators via satellite or VHF data-link (VDL) through the FlightAware website. This service requires data service with a participating data-link provider, and combines this data with existing FlightAware ANSP data feeds in 50+ countries and FlightAware's ADS-B data in 100+ countries.

FlightAware integrates with all major aircraft datalink services using ACARS or similar protocols via SATCOM or VDL, including:

- ARINC
- DeLorme
- Garmin
- Honeywell Global Data Center (GDC)
- Satcom Direct
- SITA
- Spidertracks
- Universal Weather and Aviation UVdatalink

For aircraft with cockpit datalink services, FlightAware can provide real-time worldwide flight tracking and status as well as text messaging and other operational dispatch services in some cases.

=== Global for Helicopters ===
The Global for Helicopters service began in October 2023 and allows helicopter flights to be tracked. FlightAware Global for Helicopters uses an ADS-B transponder, which is already part of the aircraft. If the aircraft is operating with a 1090 MHz transponder, Aireon's ADS-B space-based receivers can track them. Helicopter operators will be able to mark custom or temporary landing sites using coordinates.

=== Selective unblocking ===
A selective unblocking service is available for aircraft owners and operators to selectively choose friends, family, employees, and business associates who are allowed to track an aircraft's movements. When a selective unblocking is used, the aircraft movements remained blocked to the general public. An owner or operator can opt to do this for privacy or security reasons.

=== FlightAware TV ===
FlightAware TV is a web-based aircraft situational display scaled for an HDTV. FlightAware TV can be customized to show a "fleet view" to monitor an entire fleet or in "airport" view to monitor airport activity such as departures and arrivals.

=== FBO ToolBox ===
FBO ToolBox is a Web-based, market-analysis and flight-tracking application that allows FBO managers insight into their customers. Primary features include competitive fuel price analysis, airport traffic analysis, AMSTAT operator information, airport history reports, and top origins/destinations. A proprietary fuel-burn calculator estimates the number of gallons necessary to complete a filed flight plan, and can deliver FBO managers a picture of potential fuel sales on any given day. In May 2012, FlightAware launched "FBO ToolBox Europe" for airport operators in Europe.

=== Custom reports ===
Custom reports can be generated with a variety of parameters to aid aircraft owners, operators, airports, and business owners in planning decisions. For example, a historical report can be compiled to analyze air traffic frequency at a particular airport.

=== Premium accounts ===
Premium user accounts allow members access to unlimited flight alerts, increased visibility of historical flight data, European weather, tail number data, full screen HDTV maps, fleet tracking, and the ability to view more flights per page. There are three levels of premium accounts that are available for a monthly fee.

=== ADS-B ===
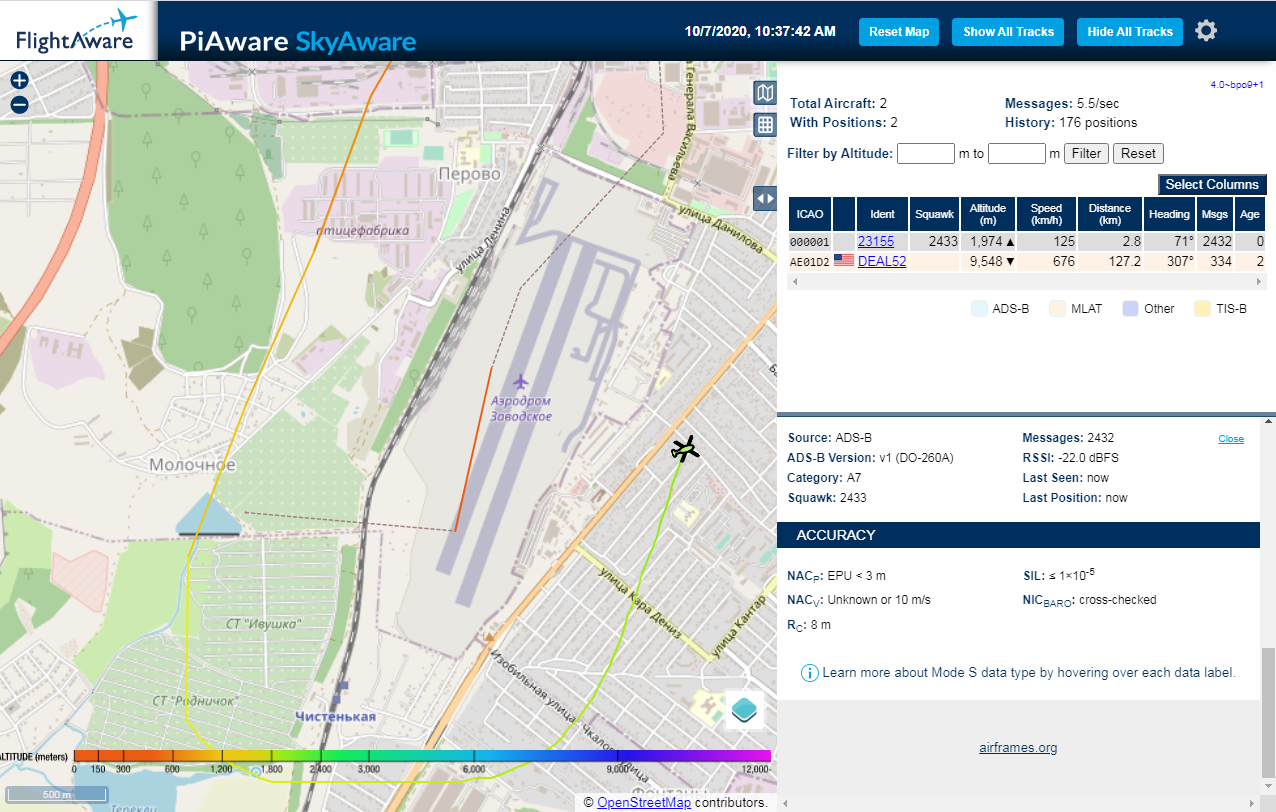
Mi-8 RF-23155 helicopter in the FlightAware receiver interface

Automatic dependent surveillance – broadcast (ADS-B) is a technology for tracking aircraft. FlightAware operates a network of ADS-B receivers for tracking ADS-B equipped aircraft. FlightAware offers that professional operators of existing ADS-B sites can connect their receivers to FlightAware and, in exchange, receive additional account features/privileges.

FlightAware produces FlightFeeder, a small ADS-B receiver that receives and processes ADS-B data, then sends it to FlightAware over the Internet and also makes the data available locally. FlightAware provides this unit free of charge to individuals in areas where FlightAware's ADS-B network does not have sufficient coverage. The company deploys 75-100 new FlightFeeders per month. As of August 13, 2023, FlightAware has 35,900 ADS-B sites in 193 countries, an increase of 16,201 sites since October 22, 2018.

In September 2016, Aireon and FlightAware announced a partnership to provide this global space-based ADS-B data to airlines for flight tracking of their fleets and, in response to Malaysia Airlines Flight 370, for compliance with the ICAO Global Aeronautical Distress and Safety System (GADSS) requirement for airlines to track their fleets.

=== APIs ===
==== AeroAPI ====
FlightAware has a query-based flight tracking API called AeroAPI (formerly FlightXML). Functionality includes flight status, airline data, maps, and push call-backs. AeroAPI can be accessed via Representational state transfer or Simple Object Access Protocol and the API can be accessed from any programming language that supports JSON or XML, including Python, Ruby, Java, Tcl, Perl, ASP, and other languages. Push notifications allow an app to be alerted about flight plans, schedule changes, departures, arrivals, cancellations, diversions, and more. AeroAPI users can also receive airline information such as gate assignments, gate times, seat information, aircraft tail number, and codeshare details.

==== Firehose ====
FlightAware has a live data feed called Firehose for third parties to incorporate live FlightAware positions around the world into their applications. Data is available as live snapshots or a streaming data feed.

=== Other ===
ARINC partnered with FlightAware and uses the FlightAware web application for ARINC Direct business aircraft operators.

SITA, Rockwell Collins, and IBM's The Weather Company partnered with FlightAware to use FlightAware's worldwide data in their products for airlines.

== See also ==
- Aireon
- Flightradar24
- MarineTraffic
