= Spidertracks =

New Zealand company

Spider Tracks Limited
- Trade name: Spidertracks
- Type: Privately held company
- Industry: Aviation
- Founded: 2007
- Founder: James McCarthy
- Headquarters: Auckland, New Zealand
- Area served: Worldwide
- Key people: Aleks Banas, CEO
- Website: www.spidertracks.com

Spidertracks was a New Zealand–based company specialising in the development of hardware and software for the general aviation industry. The company specialised in flight tracking, aviation communication, and flight data acquisition.

== History ==
Spidertracks was founded by James McCarthy in 2007 in the small rural town of Pohangina, just outside Palmerston North, New Zealand. Following the death of high-profile businessman Michael Erceg in a helicopter crash in 2005, Erceg's downed aircraft was not located for two-weeks due to the failure of an emergency locator transmitter (ELT).

McCarthy and some associates saw the opportunity to develop a lightweight, portable, 'real-time' GPS tracking device for the aviation industry.

The team developed a device known as a 'Spider' – a small device that plugs into an aircraft's auxiliary power outlet and is mounted in the cockpit.

Information such the aircraft's location, altitude, speed, and direction were transmitted via the Iridium satellite network every two minutes to the Spidertracks software platform. The founders claimed this offered a much more reliable way to locate an aircraft in an emergency situation.

Spider Tracks Limited was registered with the New Zealand Companies Office on 20 February 2007.

In 2020, Spidertracks launched their latest hardware device – 'Spider X'. According to Spidertracks, in addition to the real-time tracking and communication functions of previous models, the device is able to record and wirelessly transmit attitude and heading reference system (AHRS) data to the Spidertracks cloud-based platform. The flight data is then processed post-flight to enable a 3D virtual flight replay and reporting on specific events or safety violations. Spidertracks claim this provides a low-cost, simple solution for Flight Data Monitoring and Flight Operations Quality Assurance for the General Aviation industry.

In March 2022, investment firm Arcadea Group acquired a 95% shareholding of Spidertracks for an undisclosed sum.

In June 2023, the strategic merger of Air Maestro and Spidertracks was announced. Arcadea's Managing Director Paul Yancich stated in a press release that “Air Maestro and Spidertracks have long been solving different elements of the same fundamental challenge within aviation: how to operate a profitable, successful flight organization without ever sacrificing quality, safety, or efficiency. This is a monumental challenge, and, until this merger, no single business could come close to serving customers’ entire needs.”. Aleks Banas, CEO of Air Maestro, took over the CEO role of the combined business.

In early 2025, Spidertracks was merged with a number of other companies into Vellox Group.

== Locations ==
Spidertracks' head office was in Auckland, New Zealand, with a secondary office in Parker, Colorado.
