= Navigator Gas =

Transoceanic liquefied gas shipping company

- Company type: Transoceanic liquefied gas shipping company
- Predecessor: Navigator Gas Management Limited (NGML)
- Headquarters: The Verde, 10 Bressenden Place, London, United Kingdom
- Number of locations: 5 offices
- Area served: Worldwide
- Key people: Mads Peter Zacho (Chief Executive Officer); Oeyvind Lindeman (Chief Commercial Officer); Gary Chapman (Chief Financial Officer; Michael Schroder (Chief Operating Officer); John Reay (General Counsel and Company Secretary); Randy Giveans (Executive Vice President of Investor Relations and Business Development)
- Parent: Navigator Holdings Plc
- Website: website

Navigator Holdings Ltd. (NYSE: NVGS) is a publicly traded liquefied gas shipping company with a global market, that was initially incorporated in the Isle of Man in 1997, before being redomiciled in 2008 in the Marshall Islands. It was restructured in 2006.

In November 2013, Navigator Holdings Ltd. completed its initial public offering on the New York Stock Exchange, where its shares of common stock are traded under the ticker symbol "NVGS".

Mads Peter Zacho is the present CEO of Navigator Holdings.

== History ==
=== 1997–1999 ===
In 2006 Navigator Gas Management Limited (NGML) and its affiliated companies were under new management and owned and operated "five semi-refrigerated 22,000 cubic meter liquefied ethylene gas carriers".

In 1997, Giovanni Mahler of Lugano, Switzerland, and Shaun Fergusson Cairns of the Isle of Man and 2 other investors, formed Navigator Gas Transport PLC as an Isle of Man public limited company to "construct and operate five 22,000 cubic meter semi-refrigerated gas carriers". NGT financed the construction of "five large (22 thousand cubic meters) petrochemical gas carriers" to create a transoceanic shipping fleet capable of transporting liquefied petroleum gas and petrochemical gas, including ethylene, by issuing "$302 million in bonds in first mortgage notes and second mortgage notes. The plan was to create a "liner-like trade capability for the movement of industrial gases. All five ships are required to provide the service envisioned by Navigator (three ships circling the globe and two crossing the Atlantic). This will allow the company to provide regular service to ports in Asia, the Middle East, Europe and the Americas. The large size, segregated tanks, and on board purging and cleaning systems make the ships some of the most sophisticated in the world and will allow them great flexibility in carrying multiple types and sizes of cargoes, in calling at a wide variety of ports, and in providing faster turnaround times in port." On July 31, 1997 Moody's assigned a relatively high bond credit rating of B1 to NGT First Mortgage Bonds, partially because NGT owners were "all experienced shipping organizations." The five vessels, which would be the "largest ethylene capable vessels" built to date were to be constructed in China by Jiangnan shipyard, known for the construction of vessels such as ethylene capable gas carriers, that are technically complex.

On August 7, 1997 Navigator [Transport] Holdings and each of its subsidiaries entered into a credit agreement through the Credit Suisse First Boston(CSFB), the trade name for Credit Suisse's investment banking, for $50 million to be partially used for interest payments regarding the First and Second Notes and as working capital.

By July 30, 1999 the freight rate had decreased in the shipping industry, lowering the market value of NGT vessels under construction, which were the collateral for the NGT First Priority Ship Mortgage Notes. In response, Moody's downgraded NGT's First Notes. Moody had estimated in 1999 that each of the ethylene-capable gas carriers, which had "sophisticated cooling capacity allowing the ships to transport ethylene" were valued at over $70 million of which about $61 million was financed by debt. By 2000, Navigator Gas Management Limited (NGML) with Mahler and Cairns at the helm, was incorporated. Each of the five vessels, which were registered in Liberia, was "held by a separate subsidiary" of a "management company", Navigator Gas Management Limited (NGML). Mahler and Cairns were the directors of Navigator Holdings and its individual subsidiaries.

Cayman Island-based Cambridge Gas Transport Corporation, owned about 70% of Navigator Holdings plc with the other 30% owned by other offshore companies. Bahama-based Vela Energy Holdings Ltd owned all Cambridge shares. Mahler and Cairns were directors of both Cambridge, and Navigator. Mahler was also director of Vela.

=== 2000–2009 ===
By February 29, 2000, Moody's reported that NGT's "balance sheet" was "fragile" due to its "high leverage" and Moody's anticipated that the company would have to explore restructuring options. The delivery dates for the five vessels which were being constructed in Jiangnan, were delayed and were therefore subject to penalties imposed by the Chinese Export-Import Bank and Generale de Banque S.A.. The first vessel was on sea-trials in early 2000 and all five vessels were expected to be delivered by February 2001. Because of these factors, Moody's again lowered NGT's first notes to Caa2 from Caa1.

By March 2002, as the "market for the transportation of petrochemical gases and derivative products" continued to weaken, Moody's again downgraded NGT's first notes to a rating of Ca. By 2002, Navigator had a "fleet of five 22,000 cbm semi-refrigerated gas/ethylene carriers". But with shipping rates so low that NGT was unable to "support interest payments." In 2002 Moody's described NGT as "an Isle of Man public limited company operating out of Lugano, Switzerland and New York City."

On January 26, 2003 "Navigator Gas Transport PLC, five of its ship-owning subsidiaries, and its parent holding company, Navigator Holdings PLC", filed for bankruptcy in New York under Chapter 11 of the US Bankruptcy Code. At that time, Navigator's "business involved the ownership and operation of vessels which were utilized principally in the shipping of liquefied petroleum gas and petrochemical gas pursuant to charter agreements." The parent company (Navigator Holdings PLC) and affiliated companies, such as Cambridge Gas Transport Corp, "the non-debtor holding company that held the stock of the Debtors", and the five individual affiliated companies that owned each transport vessel, the directors and ultimate owners of the group, led by Giovanni Mahler, a Swiss citizen and resident of Lucerne, were non-residents of the United States and "had no known personal assets in the United States."

On February 6, 2003, the Official Committee of Unsecured Creditors Committee was appointed under Chapter 11. On March 17, 2004 the Bankruptcy Court confirmed the Creditors Committee Second Amended Joint Plan of Reorganisation. Then, 10,000,000 shares of new common stock were issued to holders of the old First Priority Ship Mortgage Notes who "would receive 97.25% of the newly issued shares".

From March 2004 until December 2006, Cambridge and "its controlling shareholders, led by Mahler" attempted to obstruct the creditors restructuring plan. By October 2005, Navigator Gas Management Limited (NGML), and the two NGML directors, Mahler and Cairns, owed over $13 million to their creditors and in fines to the court for "opposing the winding up proceedings". Navigator had proposed a "plan to sell the companies' assets to insiders".

Jörg G. Bucherer, grandson of the founder of Carl F. Bucherer, a Swiss haute horlogerie company based in Lucerne, Switzerland was the principal of ProConsult Limited, that had purchased $8 million of First Notes and had become the largest holder of the four Navigator Principals by 2004. ProConsult's corporate registry is located in Lugano, Switzerland but it is a British Virgin Islands corporation. There were unproven allegations that were eventually dismissed that Bucherer had acted as a nominee of Mahler as their fathers had been friends in Lucerne. "In a pleading filed in 2004, the Committee described Bucherer, among other things, as a director of several companies, as the holder of a possible $2.1 million claim against the Debtors, as the “largest holder of the four Principals”. Andrew D. Gottfried and Jay Teitelbaum representing ProConsult Limited, argued that ProConsult was "entitled" under the Creditors Committee Reorganization Plan to "receive a distribution of 128,226 shares of the Reorganized Debtors". The creditors temporarily prevented the shares from being transferred to ProConsult in August 2006. As a consequence of its success on appeal, the Committee stayed its winding up proceedings in the Isle of Man, and the U.S. Plan finally became effective on August 9, 2006. On August 9, 2006 Navigator Gas Transport plc and its affiliated companies had completing the reorganization proposed by their creditors with all equity transferred to Navigator Mortgage First and Second Notes. By 2006 Navigator Gas Management Limited (NGML) and its affiliated companies were under new management and owned and operated "five semi-refrigerated 22,000 cubic meter liquefied ethylene gas carriers". On December 29, 2006, U.S. bankruptcy court Justice Allan L. Gropper found that the Creditors Committee had not provided enough evidence to "justify further restraint" on ProConsult Shares and the Creditors Committee was denied the relief they sought. The restraint on the ProConsult shares was terminated.

=== 2010–2019 ===
In 2011 WL Ross purchased shares in Navigator Holdings Ltd. at $25 a share. In 2012 Ross acquired bankrupt Lehman Brothers Holdings stake in Navigator Holdings Ltd. in a private sale for $110 million. Over a two-year period, Ross' combined stake in Navigator represented 10%, the 42% and then 56% of the common stock.

In 2012, when Wilbur Ross—who had acquired his first stakes in Navigator in 2011 through WL Ross & Co and affiliates—increased his stake, the company was transformed. Ross, who served as Chairman of Navigator in the 2010s, arranged financing so that Navigator Gas could make major purchases which included the 2013 acquisition of Maersk's Handysize LPG fleet, two secondhand LPG carriers, and construct four new buildings. Before Ross' transactions, Navigator Gas's fleet of ten gas shipping vessels was the second largest in the world after Maersk. When Ross purchased the 34% stake of Navigator Holdings held by the then-bankrupt Lehman Brothers in August 2012, Ross' stake increased to 55.7%.

By 2013, with the purchase of Maersk's fleet, Navigator became the largest gas shipping company in the world with 27 vessels and "a 28% market share in the handysize gas segment." By 2017, Navigator Holdings had 14 ethylene-capable semi-refrigerated gas carriers, 17 semi-refrigerated and 7 fully refrigerated vessels.

=== 2020–present ===
In August 2021, Navigator Holdings merged with gas shipping company Ultragas, creating a joint fleet of 56 ships.

== Navigator Holdings Plc ==
Navigator Holdings Company (Navigator Holdings Plc), is a holding company, which was founded in 1997 with headquarters in the United Kingdom. In its first annual report published on February 1, 2001, Navigators Group Inc. self-described as "an international specialty insurance holding company with insurance company operations, underwriting management companies."

According to George Weltman, in his Editor's Choice Award March 2013 article in Marine Money, Wilbur Ross (through his company WL Ross & Co), can be credited with a "complete makeover" of Navigator Gas starting in 2012 as Ross increased his stake in the company. Ross was able to arrange financing so that Navigator could increase its fleet to become the world's largest by purchasing Maersk's fleet in 2013, buying second hand vessels and signing a contract in April 2014 with Jiangnan Shipyard/CSTC for the construction of "six 21,000 cbm semi-refrigerated ethylene carriers" These transactions by Ross built Navigator Gas's fleet from ten to 27 making it the largest in the world. By purchasing Lehman Brothers' 34% stake in Navigator in August 2012, Ross' stake increased to 55.7%.

It is the parent company of subsidiaries such as Navigator Gas L.L.C, Navigator Europa L.L.C., is the holding company or parent company of subsidiary Navigator gas shipping. Navigator Holdings Ltd. is sold on the New York stock exchange as (NYSE:NVGS).

By December 31, 2012, Navigator Holdings's subsidiaries included service companies in Singapore, the UK, a vessel owning company in Indonesia, an investment company in the UK and a holding company in Delaware. By the third quarter of 2012, Navigator Holdings Ltd. subsidiaries included Delaware-based holding company Navigator Gas US LLC, Marshall Island-based service company Navigator Gas LLC, UK-Based service company Navigator Gas Transport (NGT) Services (UK), Singapore-based service company Falcon Funding PTE Ltd, UK-based investment company Navigator Gas Invest Ltd, Indonesia-Based vessel owning company PT Navigator Khatulistiwa.

On November 10, 2014, the Privy Council declared Cambridge v creditors as an "unsafe authority for the concept of judicial assistance in international liquidations."

On May 16, 2016, in the leading case of Cambridge Gas Transport Corp v Official Committee of Unsecured Creditors (of Navigator Holdings Plc and Others), Cambridge/Navigator lawyers successfully cited Borland v Steel (1901) UK company law with approval. The case was dismissed.

By 2017 Navigator Holdings affiliates included Marshall Island-based service company Navigator Gas LLC, UK-based investment company Navigator Gas Invest Ltd (Navigator Gas Invest L.L.C.), Navigator Gas Transport P.L.C., Navigator Europa L.L.C., Navigator Atlas L.L.C., the Indonesia-Based vessel owning company PT Navigator Khatulistiwa. (Their Liquefied Gas Carrier (LPG) vessel flies the flag of Indonesia and its home port is Surabaya), Navigator Triton L.L.C., and Navigator Oberon L.L.C.

== Operations ==
=== Services ===
The Navigator Libra, a semi-refrigerated gas carrier was delivered in February 2012. In December 2012 the company had contracted a company in Jiangnan, China to build four ethylene-capable semi-refrigerated gas carriers. Liquefied Ethylene Gas (LEG) carriers are "the most sophisticated of the semi-pressurized tankers and have the ability to carry not only most other liquefied gas cargoes but can also transport ethylene fully-refrigerated at its atmospheric pressure boiling point of −104 °C (−155 °F)." Designed to carry most liquefied gas cargoes except LNG point of −104 °C (−155 °F)."

In February 2013 three Maersk Tankers were delivered to Navigator including Navigator Galaxy, Navigator Genesis, and Navigator Gusto.

By 2017, Navigator Holdings had 14 ethylene-capable semi-refrigerated gas carriers, 17 semi-refrigerated and 7 fully refrigerated vessels.

In a July 17, 2017 press brief, Navigator Holdings announced that Navigator Gas and Entreprise, an American natural gas and crude oil pipeline company with headquarters in Houston, Texas, were building an "Ethylene export terminal connected to Enterprise’s high-capacity ethylene salt dome storage and ethylene pipeline system." "Navigator Holdings Ltd - Enterprise’s ethylene storage facility will have about 600 million pounds of capacity."

=== Board of directors ===
As of June 2023, Navigator Holdings Ltd.'s board of directors is made up of Dag von Appen (Non-Executive Chairman of the Board and Director), Yngvil Åsheim, Dr. Heiko Fischer, Janette Marx, Dr. Anita Odedra, Peter Stokes and Florian Weidinger.

Navigator's biggest shareholders are BW Group Limited of Bermuda, and Ultranav International ApS of Denmark, which each own approximately 29% of Navigator Holdings Ltd.

Former shareholders have included the private equity firm, WL Ross & Co which is owned by Wilbur Ross, the U. S. Secretary of Commerce. At one time Ross was the chairman of Navigator Holdings Ltd. Ross who is now at "the helm of American trade policy", has been a major investor in Navigator since November 2011. Ross has been on the Board of Directors of Navigator Holdings since March 2012.

In an agreement between Navigator and WL Ross & Co LLC to "common shares to the value of $75,000,000" were issued on February 25, 2013. Since November 5, 2013, according to a revised Investor Rights Agreement with "WL Ross & Co. LLC and certain of its affiliated investment funds owning shares of our common stock", known collectively as the WLR Group, they have had the right to designate up to two individuals to be nominated to Navigator's Board. On July 17, 2017, Harold L (Hal) Malone, who is the Head of Transportation at the private equity firm WL Ross & Co was named as the WLR Group's designated representative. Malone replaced, Wendy Teramoto, who has been a key person in WL Ross & Co since it was established in 2000.

By January 2016, WL Ross & Co was the "biggest investor" in "Navigator Holdings, a liquefied gas shipping company." According to Bloomberg Businessweek, at an event hosting by Navigator in New York on November 30, 2016, Ross assured Butters that "Your interest is aligned to mine. The U.S. economy will grow, and Navigator will be a beneficiary."

The biggest shareholders who own 31% stake in Navigator, are "partnerships used by WL Ross & Co.", a "chain" of offshore companies in the Cayman Islands.

Ross reduced "his personal share of that stake" when he became U. S. Secretary of Commerce under President Trump's administration in February 2017. By November 2017, Ross "retained an investment in the partnerships valued between $2 million and $10 million, and stood to earn a higher share of profits as general partner."

Concerns were raised about Wendy Teramoto, in an in depth November 6, 2017 report by American Public Media (ABM). Teramato, who has been with WL Ross & Co since it was founded, served as a board member of Navigator until July 2017, "according to federal filings, two months after Ross announced the deal with China." Teramato is Ross' chief of staff at the Commerce Department. The APM Reports investigation found that Teramoto, "cut the China trade deal despite serving as a director for Navigator Holdings Ltd."

=== Clients ===
Sibur, a "Russian energy company was one of Navigator's transoceanic shipping clients from early 2012 until the timecharter contract expired in December 2023. Navigator Holdings has "received more than $68 million in revenue since 2014" from Sibur. Sibur's owners include Kirill Shamalov, who is married to the President Vladimir V. Putin’s youngest daughter and Gennady Timchenko, Putin’s "friend and judo partner." Timchenko "is subject to American sanctions." "Navigator, which increased its business dealings with Sibur even as the West sought to punish Russia’s energy sector over Mr. Putin’s incursions into Ukraine."

PDVSA, the Venezuelan state oil company, which is controlled by Nicolás Maduro is also a major client of Navigator. When the U.S. placed sanctions on PDVSA's FVP Simon Zerpa in August 2017, some PDVSA exports to the U.S. were "blocked as banks and investment funds refused to provide letters of credit to potential buyers.

==== Paradise Papers ====
On November 5, 2017 the International Consortium of Investigative Journalists (ICIJ) released the Paradise Papers, a transnational, collaborative investigation by 95 media partners based on 13.4 million leaked files related to the Bermuda-based offshore specialist Appleby, "one of the world’s largest offshore law firms". Appleby set up "some 50 companies and partnerships in the Caymans and elsewhere related to Ross", including those related to Navigator Holdings. The Cayman Islands is a British territory that "levies no corporate or personal income tax on money earned outside its jurisdiction."

On November 6, Ross claimed that "there was nothing improper about his investments" in Navigator Holdings. On November 7, Ross announced that he would "likely" "divest Russia-linked shipping stake." even though he "did nothing wrong." "Navigator did not come up at Ross' confirmation hearing in January, but he was asked about his decision to retain an interest in Diamond S Shipping, which operates 33 petroleum product tankers. Ross said his research showed that no ocean shipping cases had ever come before the Commerce Department. Ocean shipping is regulated by the Federal Maritime Commission, an independent agency."

In April 2017 Ross played an influential role in the U.S.-China bilateral trade agreement that was made following US President Donald Trump's meeting with China's paramount leader Xi Jinping on trade policy issues. The agreement allowed "U.S. companies to ship liquefied natural gas to China" At the White House Commerce Secretary Wilbur Ross told reporters, that his was a "herculean accomplishment...This is more than has been done in the whole history of U.S.-China relations on trade. Normally trade deals are denominated in multiple years, not tens of days." The bilateral agreement "welcome[s] Chinese companies negotiating agreements to purchase U.S.-produced liquefied natural gas." According to the Commerce department by mid-May, the DOJ" had "already authorized the shipment of 19.2 billion cubic feet per day of natural gas exports to China and other interested countries."

The Commerce Department announced on November 7, 2017 that Commerce Secretary Ross would divest his stakes in Diamond S Shipping and Navigator Gas LLC.

== See also ==
- LPG carrier
- LNG carrier
- List of gas carriers
- List of tankers
