= Whittington v Seale-Hayne =

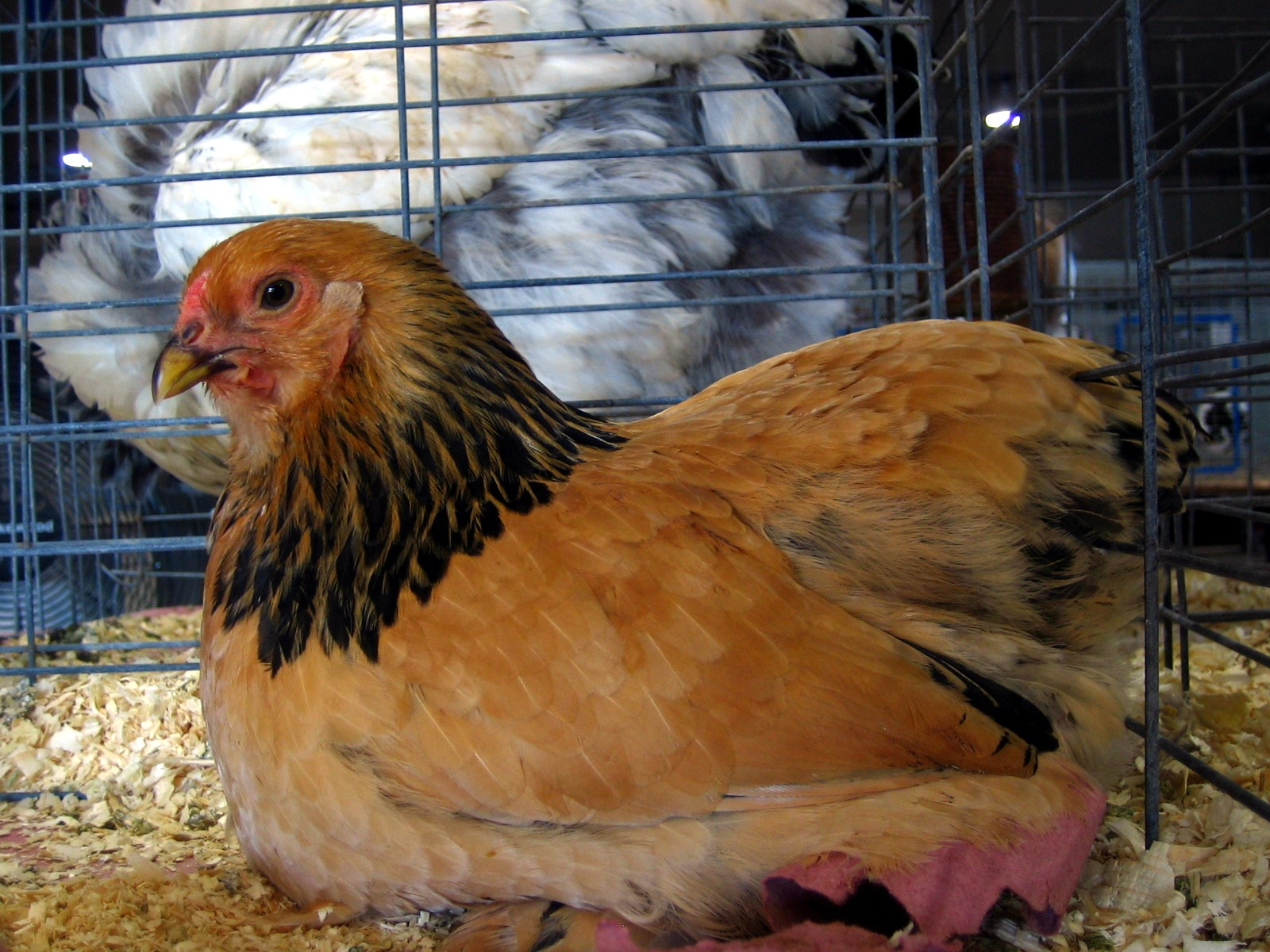
- Court: High Court
- Citation: (1900) 82 LT 49

Case opinions
- Farwell J

Keywords
- Misrepresentation, rescission

Whittington v Seale-Hayne (1900) 82 LT 49 is an English contract law case concerning misrepresentation. It holds that indemnities can be claimed under English law for any consequential costs of a contract not turning on an innocent misrepresentation (such as rent).

== Facts ==
Mr Whittington bred prize poultry. He bought a long farm lease, induced by Seale-Hayne's representation that the premises were sanitary and in good repair. However, the water supply was poisoned, Mr Whittington's manager got very ill and the poultry died. Under the lease, Mr Whittington had covenanted to carry out repairs required by the council, which were needed after the council declared the premises unfit for habitation and the drains needed renewing. It was undisputed that Whittington was entitled to indemnity for rates paid or repairs costs. Whittington sought rescission and indemnity for loss of poultry, profits and medical expenses.

== Judgment ==
Farwell J held no further losses could be claimed because it was beyond the ambit of the indemnity to which Mr Whittington was entitled. The losses did not result in a benefit to Seale. Since the representation was not fraudulent, there could be no damages and therefore no compensation either. It was not the case that the rescinder should be in a position status quo ante because 'to make good by way of compensation for the consequences of the misrepresentations is the same thing as asking for damages'.

== Significance ==
There would now be a common law claim under Hedley Byrne & Co Ltd v Heller & Partners Ltd or under s 2(1) Misrepresentation Act 1967 for damages.

== See also ==
- English contract law
- Misrepresentation in English law
