= AirNav Systems =

American flight tracking company

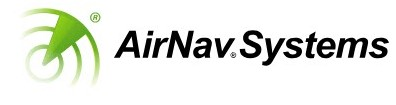
- Available in: English
- Headquarters: Tampa, Florida
- Country of origin: United States
- Owner: André Brandão
- Industry: Aircraft Tracking
- Website: www.airnavradar.com
- Commercial: Yes
- Registration: Not required
- Launched: 2001; 25 years ago
- Current status: Active

AirNav Systems is a Tampa-based global flight tracking and data services company founded in 2001. The company operates a flight tracking website and mobile app called AirNav Radar which offers worldwide tracking of commercial and general aviation flights. AirNav Systems also owns and operates a ground-based ADS-B tracking network that is supported by over 35,000 active volunteer ADS-B data feeders from over 190 countries. The company's real-time tracking and data services are also used by 25,000 aviation related businesses, government agencies, airlines, media channels and airports in over 60 countries.

The company's R&D Center and European office is located in Lisbon, Portugal.

== History ==
In 1996, while studying computer science at university, the Founder and CEO, Portuguese airline pilot and engineer André Brandão developed a flight tracking application called AirNav Suite. In 2001 he established AirNav Systems.

In early 2020, AirNav Systems announced a partnership with venture capital firm BrightCap Ventures. The same year, the company was chosen by ARGUS International, Inc to provide global flight and ground aircraft tracking services.

In October 2020, Satellite-based ADS-B data was made available to all AirNav Radar users for free. AirNav Systems currently partners with multiple satellite providers including Spire Aviation to provide satellite-based tracking on its platform.

AirNav Radar is frequently cited, and its data is used in globally renowned news outlets such as Bloomberg, CNN, the Financial Times, and the New York Times. For instance, in June 2022, the New York Times cited AirNav Radar in its report about wealthy Russians fleeing the country before and after the Russian invasion of Ukraine. Further, in March 2021, the Financial Times obtained and used flight records from AirNav Radar in an article following the disappearance of Chinese Billionaire Jack Ma. It also acquired the flight records for its report on Fu Xiaotian, a Chinese TV presenter linked to a missing foreign minister who had a surrogate child in the US. Bloomberg also used AirNav Radar flight data to report how the rapid recovery in air travel highlighted a massive shortage in staffing at European airports and airlines in 2022. Additionally, AirNav Radar flight records were used in a Bloomberg article about the German Foreign Minister's Plane being Stranded in UAE en Route to Australia in August, 2023. In March, 2022, AirNav Radar flight tracking data was also used by the UK news outlet The Guardian to report on the whereabouts of Roman Abramovich’s private jet following UK sanctions on the Russian Oligarch.

== Tracking sources ==
AirNav Systems is the parent company of AirNav Radar which displays flight data in real-time from all over the world. AirNav Radar aggregates data from 10 different sources:

- ADS-B (Ground-based): The source of this data are terrestrial ADS-B receivers, which receive and collect data from the transponders of aircraft flying within the ADS-B receivers’ range. The data gathered by these terrestrial ADS-B receivers include, aircraft speed, position, registration information and other data. These ADS-B receivers usually operate at 1090 MHz. AirNav Radar also receives flight data from UAT 978 MHz as well.
- ADS-B (Satellite-based): Aircraft transponder data is collected by Satellites equipped with ADS-B receivers. This data is then sent to AirNav Radar's servers for processing
- FAA SWIM: The Federal Aviation Administration System Wide Information Management data comes directly from the FAA's domestic radar systems and contains data on virtually all aircraft flying in US airspace. This data source includes real-time position data, flight plans, departures, arrivals, routes, waypoints.
- EUROCONTROL: In addition to flight position, registration and other data, EUROCONTROL data allows for access to flight plans and other operational information of aircraft and airports operating in the EURCONTROL region.
- MLAT: Multilateration or MLAT is a surveillance technique based on the measurement of the difference in distance to four stations at known locations by broadcast signals at known times. This data source allows for tracking of aircraft that are not equipped with ADS-B transponders.
- OCEANIC: Oceanic position data from the FAA is reported for all major trans-oceanic routes (Atlantic and Pacific).
- ADS-C: The source of data here is an aircraft broadcasting its position at fixed intervals, typically between 5 and 30 minutes. Data is exchanged between the ground system and the aircraft, via a data link, specifying under what conditions ADS-C reports would be initiated, and what data would be contained in the reports.
- HFDL: These position reports are received from a High Frequency Data Link system, where air traffic controllers can communicate with pilots over a datalink connection. Aircraft and ground stations make use of high frequency radio signals in order to communicate.
- FLIFO: This data is provided by several external sources such as airports and airlines. This commercial data includes the departure time, arrival time, origin airport, destination airport, among other parameters.
- ASDE-X: Data from ASDE-X is received from a surface movement radar located in an airport's ATC Tower or remote tower, multilateration sensors, ADS-B sensors, terminal radars, the terminal automation system, and from aircraft transponders. It is provided by the FAA.

== Products & services ==
=== Website & app ===
The AirNav Radar website is a platform that provides flight tracking information of general aviation and commercial flights. The website also displays airport activity, weather information, airport and flight statistics, aviation news and photos. Users can use the site for free or can subscribe to one of three subscription plans on the website to access premium features.

The AirNav Radar app is available for both Android on the Google Play Store & iOS on the App Store.

=== Fleet Tracker & Airport View ===
The AirNav Radar Fleet Tracker is tracking solution designed for fleet managers & owners to monitor and better manage their fleet of aircraft. In addition to viewing all active flights and statuses, fleet managers can view flight history for up to 365 days. Advanced aircraft statistics of a fleet such as total flight hours, average flight duration etc. can also be accessed.

The Airport View tool displays the live inbound (arrivals) and outbound flight traffic (departures) of a single airport within a single window. It is an excellent secondary tracking resource for Air Traffic Controllers and plane spotters. Airport View also displays the prevailing weather conditions at an airport. Weather conditions such as wind speed & direction, visibility, pressure, and cloud base can be viewed.

=== Heatmaps & Movement Statistics ===
Movement Statistics display the total aircraft traffic (arrivals & departures) at a particular airport for each day for up to 31 days.

Airport Heat Maps display the frequency of flights to different airports or cities from a particular originating airport.

The AirNav Radar real-time statistics page contains a large volume of flight data from flights tracked daily. The stats shown on this page currently display data for the past 6 months. This data can be filtered by Commercial Airlines, Business Jets, Commercial Airports, Business Operators, and by Route and can be downloaded in CSV format for free, non-commercial use.

== Flight Data API's ==
=== On-Demand API (ODAPI) ===
The On Demand API is AirNav Radar's credit-per-query API solution that allows client applications access to both real-time and historical flight data on an as-needed basis. This data is aggregated and delivered by AirNav's ground and satellite-based ADS-B network. Real-time data is sent via a secure TCP web socket connection, while historic flight tracking data is made available via a download link.

=== Firehose API ===
Firehose API is AirNav Radar's enterprise level, data stream API solution that includes over 70 data fields such as Flight Number, Call sign, Speed, Altitude, Registration, Scheduled and Actual Departure / Arrival Times, among other data fields. This data is available in JSON, XML and CSV formats.
