= Flight tracking =

Service that involves tracking of aircraft and airport activity

Flight tracking is a service that involves the tracking of flights, aircraft and airport activity, often using software.

== Overview ==
Flight tracking enables travellers as well as those picking up travellers after a flight to know whether a flight has landed or is on schedule, for example to determine whether it is time to go to the airport.

Aircraft carry ADS-B transponders, which transmit information such as the aircraft ID, GPS position, and altitude as radio signals. These radio transmission are collected by civilian ADS-B receivers located in the vicinity of the aircraft. These ADS-B receivers are only able to collect information on flights within radio-range of their position, so the data they collect is usually sent to a central server which aggregates feeds from numerous individual receivers throughout the world.

Flight tracking can be integrated with travel management and travel tracking services, allowing increased automation of travel software. This application of flight tracking is currently in its infancy, but is set to grow significantly as systems get more connected.

Despite the progress, many abrupt events like sudden weather changes are not captured by existing flight trackers because they take their information not from the airplane itself but from dispatcher centers which often do not know the actual status of plane's whereabouts.

Flight tracking software is available for commercial operators to track their aircraft and monitor if they deviate from an agreed flight path. If they do, a warning alarm is generated to alert to a potential problem. The type of software available also imports and reviews global weather and NOTAM information to monitor any emerging issues that could affect the flight.

== List of flight tracking services ==
- ADS-B exchange
- AirNav Radar
- FlightAware
- Flightradar24
- Flighty
- OpenSky Network
- Plane Finder
- Umetrip
- VariFlight

== See also ==
- Radar tracker - the process by which air tracks are formed from radar detections
