= Plane Finder =

United Kingdom-based real-time flight tracking service

- Company type: Private limited Company
- Website type: Flight tracking
- Founded: August 2009; 17 years ago
- Headquarters: Southampton, United Kingdom
- Owner: Pinkfroot Ltd
- Industry: Flight tracking
- Website: planefinder.net
- Commercial: Yes
- Launched: 2009; 17 years ago
- Current status: Active

Plane Finder is a United Kingdom-based real-time flight tracking service launched in 2009, that is able to show flight data globally. The data available includes flight numbers, how fast an aircraft is moving, its elevation and destination of travel. Several variants of the service are available as mobile apps including free, premium 3D and augmented reality versions. The flight tracking map and database can be accessed by web browsers.

Plane Finder allows registered users to share their ADS-B and MLAT data via the Plane Finder ADS-B Client, available for macOS, Windows and Linux. Plane Finder supports VFR charts from NATS, and was the first major flight tracking app to introduce a replay feature, allowing users to replay flights dating back to 2011.

== Flight tracking ==
Plane Finder collects data from its own global network of receivers, using the following sources.

=== Automatic dependent surveillance-broadcast (ADS-B) ===
A network of automatic dependent surveillance-broadcast (ADS-B) receivers gathers aircraft data such as callsign, position and speed. Plane Finder serves to supplement this data with additional information, including aircraft registration/tail number, departure airport, destination, artwork, and photographs.

Plane Finder users can apply for an ADS-B receiver in exchange for their flight data.

=== Multilateration (MLAT) ===
To deliver aircraft position data where ADS-B is unavailable, Plane Finder uses multilateration (MLAT). Using three or more receivers running Plane Finder client software, monitoring the aircraft simultaneously, the aircraft’s position is calculated using receiver location and accurate timestamps.

While European airspace is widely covered, only some parts of North American airspace are covered.

=== Federal Aviation Administration (FAA) feed ===
ADS-B is prevalent across Europe and Australia, but not in North America. Where MLAT or ADS-B data is unavailable, a feed from the Federal Aviation Administration provides flight information. The FAA feed covers United States and Canadian airspace, including bordering areas of the Atlantic and Pacific Oceans.

=== FLARM feed ===
Plane Finder collects data from a centralised FLARM feed, for monitoring small aircraft and gliders.

== Flight data source ==
The Plane Finder website and database is widely used as an information source to support articles in the media. The Independent used Plane Finder flight tracking to demonstrate to readers the flight path of flight MT2706, which turned back as a result of last minute Egyptian government flight restrictions on 6 November 2015. The Independent also used Plane Finder information to demonstrate a timeline of the speed/altitude of flight 7K 9268, a Russian plane which crashed on 31 October 2015. The BBC cited Plane Finder in regard to the point at which at British Airways flight turned back to Heathrow Airport to make an emergency landing after smoke was seen coming from its engines.

Plane Finder data has also been used to create original imagery for the media, such as the Washington Post, which used Plane Finder as a source to show flight patterns immediately after the Brussels bombings in March 2016.
