= FLARM =

Traffic avoidance system in light aircraft and gliders

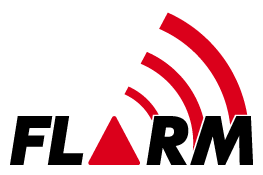
FLARM Logo

FLARM is a proprietary electronic system used to selectively alert pilots to potential collisions between aircraft. It is not formally an implementation of ADS-B, as it is optimized for the specific needs of light aircraft, not for long-range communication or ATC interaction. FLARM is a portmanteau of "flight" and "alarm". The installation of all physical FLARM devices is approved as a "Standard Change", and the PowerFLARM Core specifically as a "Minor Change" by the European Union Aviation Safety Agency; and in addition the Minor Change also approves the PowerFLARM Core for its IFR and at night.

== Operation ==
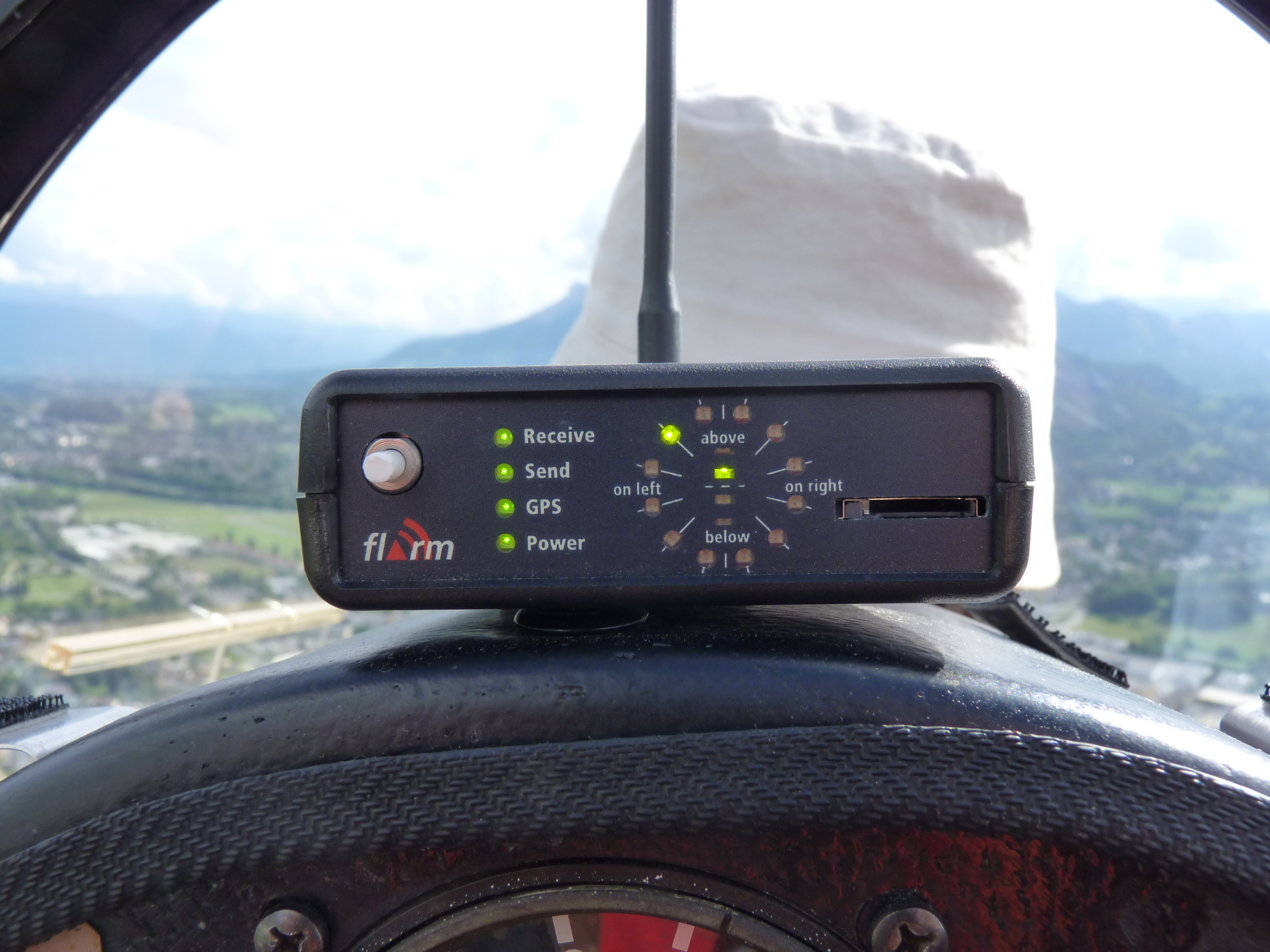
FLARM in action: An approach from the front left (LED on compass rose) and slightly above (LED "above") your own altitude is displayed. The slot for inserting the microSD card can be seen to the right.

FLARM obtains its position and altitude readings from an internal GPS and a barometric sensor and then broadcasts this together with forecast data about the future 3D flight track. At the same time, its receiver listens for other FLARM devices within range and processes the information received. Advanced motion prediction algorithms predict potential conflicts for up to 50 other aircraft and alert the pilot using visual and aural warnings. FLARM has an integrated obstacle collision warning system together with an obstacle database. The database includes both point and segmented obstacles, such as split power lines and cableways.

Unlike conventional transponders, FLARM has low power consumption and is relatively inexpensive to purchase and install. Furthermore, conventional Airborne Collision Avoidance Systems (ACAS) are not effective in preventing light aircraft from colliding with each other as light aircraft can be close to each other without danger of collision. ACAS would issue continuous and unnecessary warnings about all aircraft in the vicinity, whereas FLARM only issues selective warnings about collision risks.

== Appraisal and attention ==
FLARM Technology and the inventors of FLARM have won several awards. The Swiss Office of Civil Aviation (FOCA) also published in Dec 2010: "The rapid distribution of such systems only a few months after their introduction was not accomplished through regulatory measures, but rather on a voluntary basis and as a result of the wish on the part of the involved players to contribute towards the reduction of collision risk. The FOCA recommends that glider tow planes and helicopters that operate in lower airspace should also use collision warning systems."

In addition, FLARM is mandatory on gliders in several countries including France, and the Soaring Society of America (SSA) strongly recommends FLARM in lieu of ADS-B Out.

== Versions ==
Versions are sold for use in light aircraft, helicopters, and gliders. Newer PowerFLARM models extend the FLARM range to over 10 km. They also have an integrated ADS-B and transponder Mode-C/S receiver, making it possible to also avoid mid-air collisions with large aircraft.

Newer devices can also act as authorized flight recorders by producing files in the IGC format defined by the FAI Gliding Commission. All FLARM devices can be connected to FLARM displays or compatible avionics (EFIS, moving map, etc.) to give visual and audio warnings and also to show the intruder's position on the map. Licensed manufacturers produce integrated FLARM devices in different avionics products. FLARM devices can issue spoken warnings similar to TCAS.

== Hardware ==
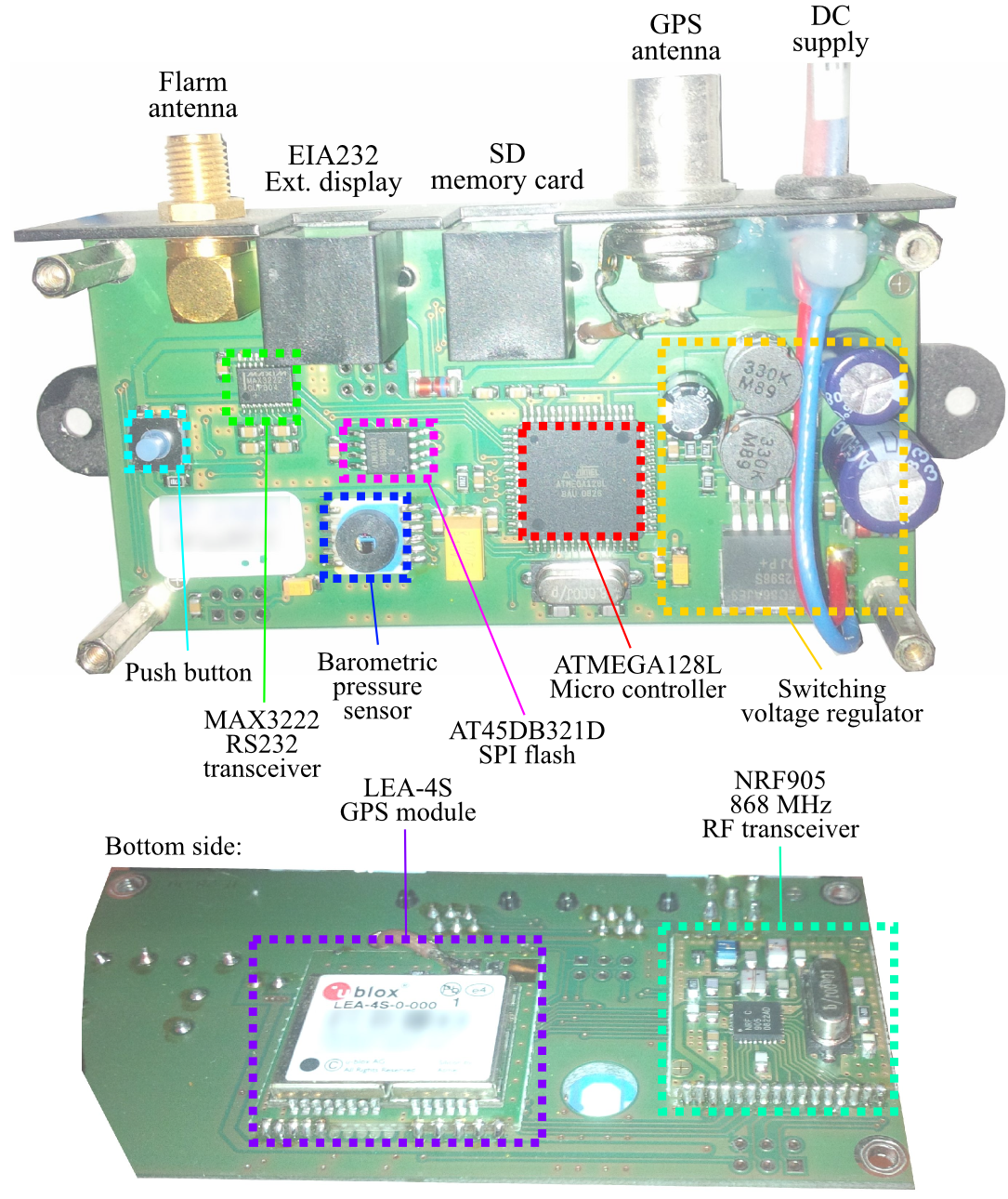
LX FLARM Red Box remote transceiver unit

A typical FLARM system consists of the following hardware components:

- Central microcontroller for data processing, e.g. Atmel AVR
- ISM/SRD band transceiver, e.g. NRF905 (Europe: 868 MHz)
- GPS module, e.g. U-blox LEA-4S
- Barometric pressure sensor, which measures cabin pressure to estimate the altitude (not used for collision avoidance, which uses GPS altitude)
- Traffic and collision warning display, e.g. light emitting diodes or LCD and a buzzer (not installed in case of special remote units)
- (micro)SD card slot for configuration, logging and firmware updates
- RS-232 interface for external displays and firmware updates

== Protocol and criticism ==
The FLARM radio protocol has always been encrypted, which is reasoned by the manufacturer to ensure the integrity of the system and also because of privacy and security considerations. Version 4 used in 2008 and Version 6 used in 2015 were reverse engineered despite its encryption. However, FLARM changes the protocol on a regular basis to add functionality and protect security.

The decryption of the FLARM radio protocol might be illegal, especially in EU countries. It may be argued, however, that traffic advisory data may legally be decrypted by third parties solely for the purpose of nearby traffic advisory and collision avoidance, which is the intended use of the system.

The radio protocol has been criticised for its proprietary encryption, including a petition encouraging a change to an open protocol. It has been argued that encryption increases processing time and contradicts the goal to increase aviation safety due to a closed monopoly market, because an open protocol could enable third-party manufacturers to develop compatible devices, spreading the use of interoperable traffic advisory systems. FLARM Technology opposed these claims as published on the petition page and published a white paper explaining the design of the system. They offer the technology to third parties, which requires the implementation of the OEM circuit board in compatible devices. Radio protocol specifications and encryption keys are not shared to third-party manufacturers.

While the FLARM serial data protocol is public, the prediction engine of FLARM is patented by Onera (France) and proprietary. It is licensed to manufacturers by FLARM Technology in Switzerland. The patent expired in 2019.

== Company ==
FLARM was founded by Urs Rothacher and Andrea Schlapbach in 2003, who were later joined by Urban Mäder in 2004. First sales were made in early 2004. Currently there are nearly 30,000 FLARM-compatible devices (around half of them produced by FLARM Technology, the rest by licensed manufacturers who have now overtaken FLARM in current sales) in use mainly in Switzerland, Poland, Germany, France, Austria, Italy, UK, the Benelux, Scandinavia, Hungary, Israel, Australia, New Zealand and South Africa.

FLARM's technology is also used in ground-based vehicles including vehicles used in surface-mining. These products are designed and produced by the Swiss company SAFEmine, now owned by Swedish Hexagon Group.
