= MarineTraffic =

Online marine traffic tracking service

- Company type: Subsidiary
- Website type: Ship tracking intelligence
- Available in: English, Spanish, Arabic, Russian, German, French, Greek, Chinese, Norwegian, Dutch and Portuguese
- Headquarters: Athens, Greece
- Parent: Kpler Holding SA
- Website: www.marinetraffic.com
- Commercial: Yes
- Registration: Optional
- Users: 8,500,000
- Launched: 2007; 19 years ago
- Current status: Open

MarineTraffic is a maritime analytics provider, which provides real-time information on the movements of ships and the current location of ships in harbors and ports. A database of information on the vessels includes for example details of the location where they were built plus dimensions of the vessels, gross tonnage and International Maritime Organisation (IMO) number. Users can submit photographs of the vessels which other users can rate.

The basic MarineTraffic service can be used without cost; more advanced functions such as satellite-based tracking are available subject to payment.

The site has six million unique visitors on a monthly basis. In April 2015, the service had 600,000 registered users.

As of October 2026, the site and app has over 8.5 million users.

== History ==
MarineTraffic was originally developed as an academic project at the University of the Aegean in Ermoupoli, Greece.

In late 2007, Professor Dimitris Lekkas published it as a trial version.

In 2022, MarineTraffic made available a free AIS processing toolbox under a Creative Commons license.

In February 2023, Belgian data and analytics firm Kpler announced the acquisition of MarineTraffic and Fleetmon for an undisclosed sum. The acquisitions closed in March 2023.

== See also ==
- Flightradar24
- Marine Vessel Traffic
- Ship Traffic
