= Gander Automated Air Traffic System =

Air traffic control system

Gander Automated Air Traffic System (GAATS) is a computer system used by NAV CANADA for air traffic control in the oceanic airspace of the Gander Area Control Centre (ACC).

Air traffic control procedures in oceanic airspace (see North Atlantic Operations and Airspace Manual, ICAO NAT Doc 007) differ significantly from those in most continental airspace due to limited surveillance of aircraft and historically less reliable communication with pilots (although modern developments have substantially improved both). Operations therefore need to be more strategic rather than tactical. For example, the time at which a flight will reach each of its waypoints along its route across the ocean must be calculated as accurately as possible so that controllers at the ACC can issue a clearance to the aircraft before it enters oceanic airspace that is guaranteed to be free of conflict with other aircraft until it reaches the opposite coast. Such a clearance specifies the ocean entry time, route, altitude, and speed.

GAATS is specifically designed to support air traffic control staff in this operation by automating critical functions, including vital safety monitoring.

== Main Functions ==
- Flight plan acquisition
- Flight time calculations based on four-dimensional upper-air weather forecasts
- Data exchange with adjacent ATC facilities
- Communication with flight crews via Controller–Pilot Data Link Communications (CPDLC)
- Flight route assignment
- Aircraft-to-aircraft conflict prediction and alerting in accordance with North Atlantic separation standards (ICAO NAT Doc-008)
- Flight conformance monitoring
- Aircraft-to-reserved-airspace conflict prediction
- Flight clearance delivery
- Tools for generating and promulgating the daily North Atlantic Organized Track System
- Receipt of aircraft position reports through various channels, including space-based ADS-B and ADS-C
- Controller workstations, including situation displays (similar to traditional radar displays but based on merged surveillance data and flight route projections)
- Flight strip printing and display

== North Atlantic Operations ==
The North Atlantic airspace is the busiest oceanic airspace in the world, handling up to 3,000 flights per day between North America and Europe. Traffic peaks occur during the eastbound flow at night and the westbound flow during the day. The airspace is served by several control centres, but the majority of traffic is handled by Gander Oceanic ACC and Shanwick Oceanic Control, operated by NATS in the United Kingdom. The boundary between their airspaces lies at 30 degrees west longitude, where flights transfer from one centre’s jurisdiction to the other. As a result, a high volume of flight coordination messages flows between GAATS and Shanwick’s flight data system, which is itself now a version of GAATS.

== History ==
The first version of GAATS was built by IBM for the Canadian Ministry of Transport and became operational in 1968. It provided essential core functions for flight plan handling, route assignment, flight strip printing, position report processing, and even conflict prediction. However, it had no connections to external systems; at the time, adjacent control centres had no flight data automation of their own, so extensive voice coordination and other manual tasks remained necessary.

Early GAATS was implemented on an IBM 1800 computer (essentially a minicomputer in a mainframe). CRT displays did not yet exist, so to allow controllers to quickly enter flight plan changes, GAATS used special panels of illuminated pushbuttons. These were cleverly designed to allow rapid flight plan modifications, including complete route changes.

Programming was carried out using punched cards and line printers, using only low-level machine instructions (assembly language) and no operating system. New functions were gradually added through yearly upgrades. In the early 1970s, GAATS was connected to the UK system at the control centre in Prestwick, Scotland, creating the first oceanic ATC data link and eliminating a large volume of voice coordination.

The second version of GAATS was a complete rewrite on a modern platform: the Digital Equipment Corporation PDP-11 minicomputer running the RSX-11M operating system and programmed in the high-level language Pascal. This system became operational in 1981, with a hot cutover from the old system coinciding with the move of control centre operations to a new building. It provided CRT/keyboard text terminals for all controllers and support staff.

After several years, increasing air traffic volumes and new functionality began to tax system performance, and the PDP-11 computers were replaced with Digital Equipment MicroVAX systems. The software was ported to the VMS operating system and VAX Pascal. A subsequent hardware upgrade introduced the Compaq Alpha 1000A server. On this platform, additional functions were added, particularly data links to other facilities and systems.

== World’s First Air–Ground ATC Data Link ==
As jet aircraft designs modernized in the 1980s, flight crews transitioned from three members to two, eliminating the flight engineer. This created a challenge for the critical oceanic clearance delivery process, in which ATC communicates by voice with the flight crew prior to entry into oceanic airspace to convey the full routing across the ocean. For safety reasons, two flight crew members are required to listen to the clearance, write it down, and enter it into the aircraft’s flight management system (FMS). With a two-person crew, this left no one available to actively fly the aircraft during the process.

Air Canada took the first initiative to solve this problem, working with Gander ACC to adapt their Aircraft Communications Addressing and Reporting System (ACARS) air–ground network to send oceanic clearances directly from GAATS to the aircraft. The aircraft would then send a read-back electronically for GAATS to verify. Once the clearance was confirmed, the pilot could, with the push of a button, transfer the route points directly into the FMS. Today, this process is handled more generally through Controller–Pilot Data Link Communications (CPDLC).

== Recent Upgrades ==
Around 2014, NAV CANADA implemented a major upgrade known as GAATS+. One of its most significant features was the integration of space-based ADS-B data streams, which greatly enhanced ATC services by enabling reduced aircraft separation, more responsive approval of pilot requests, improved monitoring of flight profile deviations, and better accommodation of emergency rerouting. Closer spacing of traffic allows more optimal flight trajectories in terms of route, altitude, and speed, significantly reducing fuel consumption.

Controller workstations were also enhanced with more sophisticated tools, including electronic flight strips that replaced traditional paper strips.
