= Equipment codes =

Group of equipment onboard aircraft

An equipment code describes the communication (COM), navigation (NAV), approach aids and surveillance transponder equipment on board an aircraft. These alphabetic codes are used on FAA and ICAO flight plan forms to aid flight service station (FSS) personnel in their handling of aircraft.

On the FAA domestic flight plan form (FAA Form 7233-1) the equipment code is a single character placed in block 3 (Aircraft Type / Special Equipment) as a suffix to the aircraft type code. A single letter is used to represent a radio navigational capability and transponder combination.

On the ICAO flight plan form (e.g. FAA Form 7233-4 based on the format specified by ICAO Doc 4444) one or more alphabetic codes are placed in box 10. Multiple letters are used to describe individual radio navigational capabilities and a single letter is used to designate the transponder. The FAA began requiring the ICAO format form for domestic flights desiring RNAV routes on 29 July 2008. The ICAO format has already been in use for all domestic flight plans in Canada, Mexico and many other countries for a number of years.

Regardless of the form used, air traffic controllers (ATC) issue clearances based on filed equipment codes, therefore it is important for pilots to use the appropriate coding. For example, if a desired route requires GPS, then the pilot should file /G, even if the aircraft also qualifies for other suffixes (this may be moot due to new RNAV routing requirements to use the ICAO form & codes). Pilots are recommended to file the maximum capability of their aircraft in the equipment suffix.

To see the differences in the coding systems, consider a VFR aircraft with a VHF communication radio, VOR receiver with glideslope for ILS approaches, ADF, a GPS and a pressure altitude reporting transponder. It would be coded as SG/C on an ICAO form and as /G on the FAA domestic form. Add a DME to the panel and the ICAO code becomes SDG/C while the FAA code remains /G. Then, if the ADF stops receiving the ICAO code becomes DGLOV/C while the FAA code remains /G. More letters with the ICAO format mean more information about the aircraft's radio navigation capability is available to the ATS controller than with the older FAA coding system.

== List of ICAO Codes (As of 15 November 2012) ==
=== Radio communication, navigation and approach aid equipment and capabilities ===
- A GBAS landing system
- B LPV (APV with SBAS)
- C LORAN C
- D DME
- E1 FMC WPR ACARS
- E2 D-FIS ACARS
- E3 PDC ACARS
- F ADF
- G GNSS (If the letter G is used, the types of external GNSS augmentation, if any, are specified in Item 18 following the indicator NAV/ and separated by a space.)
- H HF RTF (HF RadioTelephone)
- I INS
- J1 CPDLC ATN VDL Mode 2
- J2 CPDLC FANS 1/A HFDL
- J3 CPDLC FANS 1/A VDL Mode A/0
- J4 CPDLC FANS 1/A VDL Mode 2
- J5 CPDLC FANS 1/A SATCOM (INMARSAT)
- J6 CPDLC FANS 1/A SATCOM (MTSAT)
- J7 CPDLC FANS 1/A SATCOM (Iridium)
- K MLS
- L ILS
- M1 ATC RTF SATCOM (INMARSAT)
- M2 ATC RTF (MTSAT)
- M3 ATC RTF (Iridium)
- N No COM/NAV equipment for the route carried or is unserviceable.
- O VOR
- P1-P9 Reserved for RCP
- Q (Not allocated)
- R PBN approved (If the letter R is used, the performance based navigation levels that can be met are specified in Item 18 following the indicator PBN/.)
- S Standard Equipment composed of VHF, VOR and ILS, unless another combination is prescribed by the appropriate ATS authority.
- T TACAN
- U UHF RTF
- V VHF RTF
- W RVSM approved
- X MNPS approved
- Y Indicates 8.33 kHz radio band spacing (a standard requirement)
- Z Other equipment carried or other capabilities

=== Surveillance equipment codes ===
==== SSR (secondary surveillance radar) ====
- N No surveillance equipment for the route to be flown is carried, or the equipment is unserviceable
- A Transponder – Mode A (4 digits – 4,096 codes)
- C Transponder – Mode A (4 digits – 4,096 codes) and Mode C
- E Transponder — Mode S, including aircraft identification, pressure-altitude and extended squitter (ADS-B) capability
- H Transponder — Mode S, including aircraft identification, pressure-altitude and enhanced surveillance capability
- I Transponder — Mode S, including aircraft identification, but no pressure-altitude capability
- L Transponder — Mode S, including aircraft identification, pressure-altitude, extended squitter (ADS-B) and enhanced surveillance capability
- P Transponder — Mode S, including pressure-altitude, but no aircraft identification capability
- S Transponder — Mode S, including both pressure altitude and aircraft identification capability
- X Transponder — Mode S with neither aircraft identification nor pressure-altitude capability

==== ADS-B ====
- B1 ADS-B with dedicated 1090 MHz ADS-B “out” capability
- B2 ADS-B with dedicated 1090 MHz ADS-B “out” and “in” capability
- U1 ADS-B “out” capability using UAT
- U2 ADS-B “out” and “in” capability using UAT
- V1 ADS-B “out” capability using VDL Mode 4
- V2 ADS-B “out” and “in” capability using VDL Mode 4

==== ADS-C ====
- D1 ADS-C with FANS 1/A capabilities
- G1 ADS-C with ATN capabilities

== List of FAA aircraft equipment codes for US domestic flights ==
Source: These codes are being phased out now as FAA adopted the ICAO equipment code system.

=== No DME ===
- /X No transponder
- /T Transponder with no Mode C
- /U Transponder with Mode C

=== DME ===
- /D No transponder
- /B Transponder with no Mode C
- /A Transponder with Mode C

=== TACAN only ===
- /M No transponder
- /N Transponder with no Mode C
- /P Transponder with Mode C

=== Basic RNAV ===
- /Y LORAN, VOR/DME, or INS with no transponder
- /C LORAN, VOR/DME, or INS, transponder with no Mode C
- /I LORAN, VOR/DME, or INS, transponder with Mode C
- /Z RVSM + /I capability

=== Advanced RNAV ===
- /V RNAV capability with GNSS and no transponder
- /S RNAV capability with GNSS and transponder without Mode C
- /G RNAV capability with GNSS and Mode C transponder
- /W RVSM with DME and Mode C transponder
- /L RVSM + /G capability

=== Miscellaneous ===
- /H Any navigation capability with failed transponder
- /O Any navigation capability with failed transponder Mode C
