= Shanwick Oceanic Control =

Atlantic Ocean air traffic control area

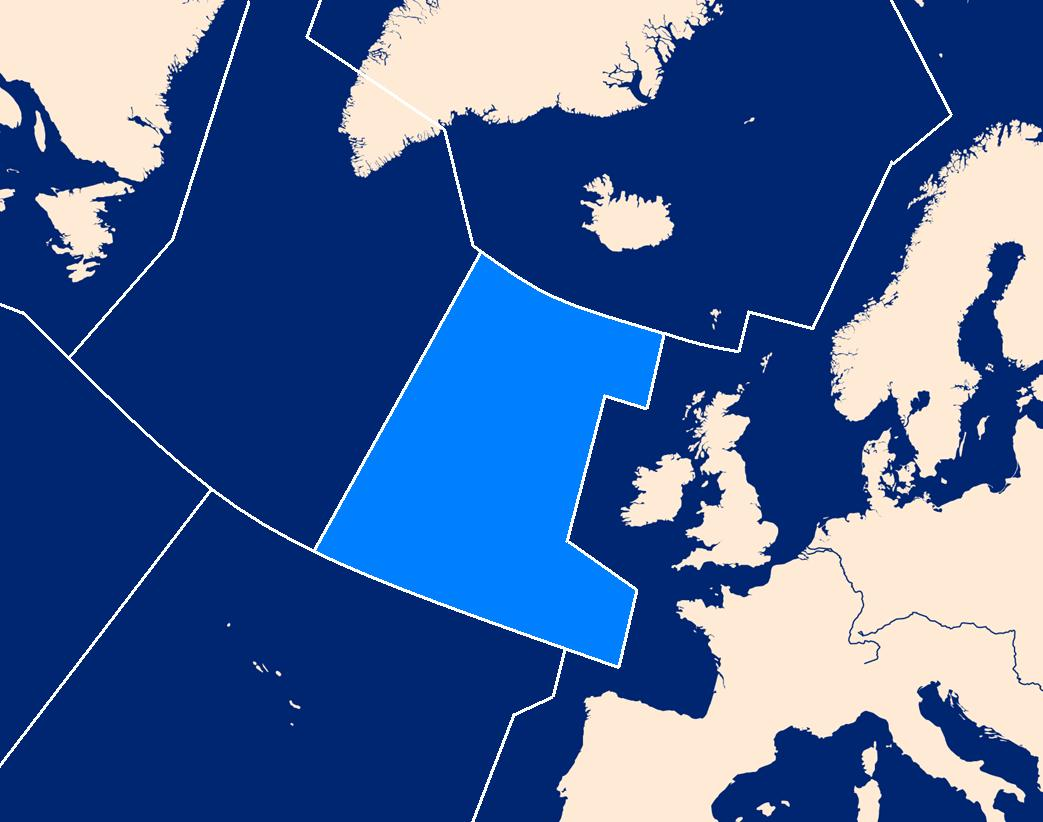
Map indicating location of the Shanwick OCA

Shanwick is the air traffic control (ATC) name given to the area of international airspace which lies above the northeast part of the Atlantic Ocean.

The Shanwick Oceanic Control Area (OCA) abuts Reykjavík OCA to the north, Gander OCA to the west and Santa Maria OCA to the south. Shanwick also has eastern boundaries with the Scottish, Shannon, London, Brest and Madrid domestic ATC flight information regions. Almost all transatlantic flights between Europe and North America will come under the control of Shanwick at some point of their journey.

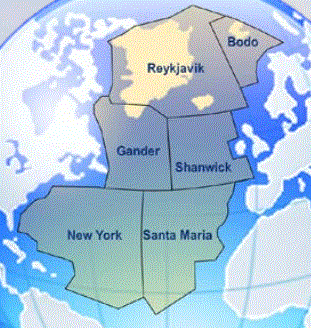
Oceanic Control Areas over North Atlantic

== History ==
Responsibility for the provision of air traffic services within international airspace is delegated to United Nations member states by the International Civil Aviation Organisation (ICAO). ICAO divides such airspace into flight information regions, parts of which may be deemed controlled airspace and, where appropriate, classified as an Oceanic Control Area.

Prior to 1966, both the United Kingdom and the Republic of Ireland were selected by ICAO to provide control and communications services to air traffic within adjacent areas of the north east Atlantic. The air/ground High Frequency (HF) radio communication station at Ballygirreen, near Shannon, County Clare, Ireland, provided HF communications to the Irish Aviation Authority ATC centre at Shannon. The HF radio communication station at Birdlip, England, provided HF communications to the Civil Aviation Authority (now NATS) ATC centre at Prestwick, Scotland.

The resulting duplication of work between ATC providers resulted in an agreement being reached between the UK and Irish governments, where Birdlip and Ballygirreen would work as a single unit. The Prestwick Centre assumed the control function of the joint area and Ballygirreen ultimately assumed sole responsibility for HF communications. The name Shanwick is a portmanteau of Shannon and Prestwick.

== Operation ==
Responsibility for providing an Air Traffic Control Service (Including Flight Information Service and Alerting Service) to aircraft in receipt of a procedural control or ADS-B surveillance service falls to the Prestwick Centre, which also provides CPDLC and ADS-C services for suitably equipped aircraft. Voice radio communications are shared between the CDOs (clearance delivery officers) based at Prestwick Centre and the Irish Aviation Authority (IAA) Radio Operators from Shannon Aeradio, based in Ballygirreen. Shanwick Control further delegates control of traffic within the NOTA (Northern Oceanic Transition Area) and the SOTA (Shannon Oceanic Transition Area) to Shannon Control, and traffic in the Brest Oceanic Transition Area (BOTA) to Brest Control.

Ballygirreen establishes radio contact with flights within the Shanwick OCA by means of HF radio, using the radiotelephony callsign "Shanwick Radio". HF can provide global coverage due to its ability to reflect (see refraction) off the ionosphere and can span the globe in a series of skips. VHF coverage, however, is normally limited to line-of-sight range.

"Shanwick Radio" uses over twenty HF channels and two VHF channels. At peak times its communications with aircraft is in excess of 1,600 aircraft during a 24-hour period. Shanwick Radio maintain HF communications with all flights within the Shanwick Oceanic Control Area and are responsible for issuing voice clearances to those flights unable to contact Air Traffic Control Officers at Prestwick Centre directly via CPDLC.

Using the callsign "Shanwick Oceanic", the Prestwick Centre has two dedicated VHF frequencies specifically for the issue of oceanic clearances by Clearance Delivery Officers, (Radio operator licensed Air Traffic Services Assistants), to westbound flights entering the Shanwick OCA, and also provides an ACARS based system called Oceanic Clearance Link (OCL) for suitably equipped aircraft to obtain such clearances without the need for voice communications.

Using the callsign "Shanwick Control", Air Traffic Control Officers at Prestwick are able to communicate directly, on a dedicated VHF channel, with pilots in the south east corner of the Shanwick OCA, who are routing via the fixed Tango routes, (T9 and T290).

== Operations transfer ==
During October 2009, NATS transferred its Oceanic ATC operations from the former Prestwick Oceanic Area Control Centre (OACC) into the £300M Prestwick Centre. The Prestwick OACC had been located within the Scottish & Oceanic Area Control Centre (ScOACC) at NATS' Atlantic House facility, adjacent to the Prestwick Centre. The Prestwick Centre is also home to the Scottish Area Control Centre (including, since January 2010, the former Manchester Area Control Centre).

Oceanic ATC operations at the Prestwick Centre are undertaken using the Nav Canada designed ATC flight data system, Gander Automated Air Traffic System+ (GAATS+). GAATS+ has been in service with NATS since November 2014. (Located close to Gander International Airport, Newfoundland, Canada, is the Nav Canada Gander ATC centre which is responsible for flights in the northwest part of the North Atlantic.) GAATS+ enables controllers to maintain accurate flight data, undertake communications with flights and electronically communicate with adjacent ATC units.

== Upgrades ==
During 2005–2006, upgrades to the Shanwick Radio and Shannon Aeradio equipment at Ballygirreen took place and the IAA entered into an agreement with the Flugstoðir (Icelandic ATC, known as ISAVIA) subsidiary Gannet ATS Communications to provide additional HF communication services within the Shanwick OCA via the Gufunes Telecommunications Centre (in Reykjavík, Iceland). In June 2015, the IAA deployed a "Virtual Centre". With this system, ISAVIA operates VCCS (Voice Communications Control System) equipment at Gufunes. Additionally, an identical IAA also operates VCCS equipment at Ballygirreen. The two VCCS sites can function jointly as a single "virtual centre", or they can operate independently.

== Long-range radar ==
In July 2015, it was revealed the Irish government would purchase a new long-range radar system for the Irish Aviation Authority and the Irish Defence Forces (military) to monitor covert aircraft flying in Irish-controlled airspace, including military aircraft that do not file a flight plan and do not have their transponders switched on. Irish Minister for Defence, Simon Coveney, said the increased capability would provide greater surveillance of airspace over the Atlantic Ocean which the IAA managed.

== Traffic statistics ==
During the summer 2025, Shanwick handled a record 1,970 transatlantic flights on 3 July. Approximately 80% of flights within the North Atlantic region fly through Shanwick airspace.

Approximately 80% of flights within Shanwick airspace communicate directly with Shanwick using ADS-C and CPDLC. These systems permit voice-free communications. However, all aircraft within Shanwick must still maintain HF contact with Shanwick Radio.

== See also ==
- Winstone radio station
- NATS
- Santa Maria Oceanic Control
- North Atlantic Tracks
