= Code =

System of rules to convert information into another form or representation

In communications and information processing, a code is a system of rules to convert information—such as a letter, word, sound, image, or gesture—into another form, sometimes shortened or secret, for communication through a communication channel or storage in a storage medium.

An early example of a code is language, which enables a person, through speech, to communicate what they think, see, hear, or feel to others. But speech limits the range of communication to the distance a voice can carry and limits the audience to those present when the speech is uttered. The invention of writing, which converted spoken language into visual symbols, extended the range of communication across space and time.

The process of encoding converts information from a source into symbols for communication or storage. Decoding is the reverse process, converting code symbols back into a form that the recipient understands.

One role of coding is to enable communication in places where ordinary plain language, spoken or written, is difficult or impossible. For example, semaphore, where the configuration of flags held by a signaler or the arms of a semaphore tower encodes parts of the message, typically individual letters and numbers. Another person standing a great distance away can interpret the flags and reproduce the words sent.

== Theory ==
In information theory and computer science, a code is usually considered as an algorithm that uniquely represents symbols from some source alphabet, by encoded strings, which may be in some other target alphabet. An extension of the code for representing sequences of symbols over the source alphabet is obtained by concatenating the encoded strings.

Before giving a mathematically precise definition, this is a brief example. The mapping

$$C = \{\, a\mapsto 0, b\mapsto 01, c\mapsto 011\,\}$$

is a code, whose source alphabet is the set $\{a,b,c\}$ and whose target alphabet is the set $\{0,1\}$. Using the extension of the code, the encoded string 0011001 can be grouped into codewords as 0 011 0 01, and these in turn can be decoded to the sequence of source symbols acab.

Using terms from formal language theory, the precise mathematical definition of this concept is as follows: let S and T be two finite sets, called the source and target alphabets, respectively. A code $C:\, S \to T^*$ is a total function mapping each symbol from S to a sequence of symbols over T. The extension $C'$ of $C$, is a homomorphism of $S^*$ into $T^*$, which naturally maps each sequence of source symbols to a sequence of target symbols.

=== Variable-length codes ===
In this section, we consider codes that encode each source (clear text) character by a codeword from some dictionary, and concatenation of such codewords give us an encoded string. Variable-length codes are especially useful when clear text characters have different probabilities; see also entropy encoding.

A prefix code is a code with the "prefix property": there is no valid codeword in the system that is a prefix (start) of any other valid codeword in the set. Huffman coding is the most known algorithm for deriving prefix codes. Prefix codes are widely referred to as "Huffman codes" even when the code was not produced by a Huffman algorithm. Other examples of prefix codes are telephone country codes, the country and publisher parts of ISBNs, and the Secondary Synchronization Codes used in the UMTS WCDMA 3G Wireless Standard.

Kraft's inequality characterizes the sets of codeword lengths that are possible in a prefix code. Virtually any uniquely decodable one-to-many code, not necessarily a prefix one, must satisfy Kraft's inequality.

=== Error-correcting codes ===
Codes may also be used to represent data in a way more resistant to errors in transmission or storage. This so-called error-correcting code works by including carefully crafted redundancy with the stored (or transmitted) data. Examples include Hamming codes, Reed–Solomon, Reed–Muller, Walsh–Hadamard, Bose–Chaudhuri–Hochquenghem, Turbo, Golay, algebraic geometry codes, low-density parity-check codes, and space–time codes. Error detecting codes can be optimised to detect burst errors, or random errors.

== Examples ==
=== Codes in communication used for brevity ===
A cable code replaces words (e.g. ship or invoice) with shorter words, allowing the same information to be sent with fewer characters, more quickly, and less expensively.

Codes can be used for brevity. When telegraph messages were the state of the art in rapid long-distance communication, elaborate systems of commercial codes that encoded complete phrases into single mouths (commonly five-minute groups) were developed, so that telegraphers became conversant with such words as BYOXO ("Are you trying to weasel out of our deal?"), LIOUY ("Why do you not answer my question?"), BMULD ("You're a skunk!"), or AYYLU ("Not clearly coded, repeat more clearly."). Codewords were chosen for various reasons: length, pronounceability, etc. Meanings were chosen to fit perceived needs: commercial negotiations, military terms for military codes, diplomatic terms for diplomatic codes, any and all of the preceding for espionage codes. Codebooks and codebook publishers proliferated, including one run as a front for the American Black Chamber run by Herbert Yardley between the First and Second World Wars. The purpose of most of these codes was to save on cable costs. The use of data coding for data compression predates the computer era; an early example is the telegraph Morse code where more-frequently used characters have shorter representations. Techniques such as Huffman coding are now used by computer-based algorithms to compress large data files into a more compact form for storage or transmission.

=== Character encoding ===
A character encoding describes how character-based data (text) is encoded. Antiquated encoding systems used a fixed number of bits, ranging from 4 to 7, but modern systems use one or more 8-bit bytes for each character. ASCII, the dominant system for decades, uses one byte for each character, and therefore, can encode up to 256 different characters. To support natural languages with more characters, other systems were invented that use more than one byte or a variable number of bytes for each character. A writing system with a large character set such as Chinese, Japanese and Korean can be represented with a multibyte encoding. Early multibyte encodings were fixed-length, meaning that each character is represented by the same number of bytes, making them suitable for decoding via a lookup table. On the other hand, a variable-width encoding is more complex to decode since it cannot be decoded via a single lookup table and must be processed sequentially, but it supports a more efficient representation of a large character set by using a smaller representation for more commonly used characters. Today, UTF-8, an encoding of the Unicode character set, is the most common text encoding used on the Internet.

=== Genetic code ===
Biological organisms contain genetic material that is used to control their function and development. This is DNA, which contains units named genes from which messenger RNA is derived. This in turn produces proteins through a genetic code in which a series of triplets (codons) of four possible nucleotides can be translated into one of twenty possible amino acids. A sequence of codons results in a corresponding sequence of amino acids that form a protein molecule; a type of codon called a stop codon signals the end of the sequence.

=== Gödel code ===
In mathematics, a Gödel code is the basis for the proof of Gödel's incompleteness theorem. Here, the idea is to map mathematical notation to a natural number (using a Gödel numbering).

=== Other ===
There are codes using colors, like traffic lights, the color code employed to mark the nominal value of the electrical resistors or that of the trashcans devoted to specific types of garbage (paper, glass, organic, etc.).

In marketing, coupon codes can be used for a financial discount or rebate when purchasing a product from a (usual internet) retailer.

In military environments, specific sounds with the cornet are used for different uses: to mark some moments of the day, to command the infantry on the battlefield, etc.

Communication systems for sensory impairments, such as sign language for deaf people and braille for blind people, are based on movement or tactile codes.

Musical scores are the most common way to encode music.

Specific games have their own code systems to record the matches, e.g. chess notation.

=== Cryptography ===
In the history of cryptography, codes were once common for ensuring the confidentiality of communications, although ciphers are now used instead.

Secret codes intended to obscure the real messages, ranging from serious (mainly espionage in military, diplomacy, business, etc.) to trivial (romance, games) can be any kind of imaginative encoding: flowers, game cards, clothes, fans, hats, melodies, birds, etc., in which the sole requirement is the pre-agreement on the meaning by both the sender and the receiver.

== Other examples ==
Other examples of encoding include:

- Encoding (in cognition) - a basic perceptual process of interpreting incoming stimuli; technically speaking, it is a complex, multi-stage process of converting relatively objective sensory input (e.g., light, sound) into a subjectively meaningful experience.
- Text encoding uses a markup language to tag the structure and other features of a text to facilitate processing by computers. (See also Text Encoding Initiative.)
- Semantics encoding of formal language A in formal language B is a method of representing all terms (e.g. programs or descriptions) of language A using language B.
- Data compression transforms a signal into a code optimized for transmission or storage, generally done with a codec.
- Neural encoding - the way in which information is represented in neurons.
- Memory encoding - the process of converting sensations into memories.
- Television encoding: NTSC, PAL and SECAM

Other examples of decoding include:

- Decoding (computer science)
- Decoding methods, methods in communication theory for decoding codewords sent over a noisy channel
- Digital signal processing, the study of signals in a digital representation and the processing methods of these signals
- Digital-to-analog converter, the use of analog circuit for decoding operations
- Word decoding, the use of phonics to decipher print patterns and translate them into the sounds of language

== Codes in practical use ==
In everyday usage of the term, "code" refers to an element of a "code system". For example, the "postal code of my home" is a geocode that identifies a geographical entity in a local system (e.g. ZIP Code system of U.S.). Typical codes are alphanumeric identifiers.

Acronyms and abbreviations can be also considered "codes", and in a sense, all languages and writing systems are codes for human thought.

International Air Transport Association airport codes are three-letter codes used to designate airports and used for bag tags. Station codes are similarly used on railways but are usually national, so the same code can be used for different stations if they are in different countries.

Occasionally, a codeword achieves an independent existence (and meaning) while the original equivalent phrase is forgotten or at least no longer has the precise meaning attributed to the codeword. For example, '30' was widely used in journalism to mean "end of story", and has been used in other contexts to signify "the end".

== See also ==
- ADDML
- Asemic writing
- Cipher
- Code (semiotics)
- Cultural code
- Equipment codes
- Quantum error correction
- Semiotics
- Universal language
