= PDLC =

PDLC may refer to:

- Peterborough and District Labour Council, the central body of union locals in Peterborough County, Ontario, Canada
- Polymer dispersed liquid crystals, also known as Smart glass
- Premium downloadable content, see Downloadable content

== See also ==
- Controller–pilot data link communications (CPDLC), used by air traffic controllers to communicate with pilots
