= SELCAL =

Radio alert system from ground communicators for aircrew

In international aviation, SELCAL or SelCal is a selective-calling radio system that can alert an aircraft's crew that a ground radio station wishes to communicate with the aircraft. SELCAL uses a ground-based encoder and radio transmitter to broadcast an audio signal that is picked up by a decoder and radio receiver on an aircraft. The use of SELCAL allows an aircraft crew to be notified of incoming communications even when the aircraft's radio has been muted. Thus, crewmembers need not devote their attention to continuous radio listening.

== Use ==
SELCAL operates on the high frequency (HF) or very high frequency (VHF) radio frequency bands used for aircraft communications. HF radio often has extremely high levels of background noise and can be difficult or distracting to listen to for long periods of time. As a result, it is common practice for crews to keep the radio volume low unless the radio is immediately needed. A SELCAL notification activates a signal to the crew that they are about to receive a voice transmission, so that the crew has time to raise the volume.

An individual aircraft has its own assigned SELCAL code. To initiate a SELCAL transmission, a ground station radio operator enters an aircraft's SELCAL code into a SELCAL encoder. The encoder converts the four-letter code into four designated audio tones. The radio operator's transmitter then broadcasts the audio tones on the aircraft's company radio frequency channel in sequence: the first pair of tones are transmitted simultaneously, lasting about one second; a silence of about 0.2 seconds; followed by the second pair of tones, lasting about one second.

The code is received by any aircraft receiver monitoring the radio frequency on which the SELCAL code is broadcast. A SELCAL decoder is connected to each aircraft's radio receiver. When a SELCAL decoder on an aircraft receives a signal containing its own assigned SELCAL code, it alerts the aircraft's crew by sounding a chime, activating a light, or both.

The crew next turns up the volume on the aircraft radio to hear the incoming voice transmission. Using ICAO radio protocol, they must verify with the transmitting operator that they are the intended message recipients. The crew then uses the received information.

SELCAL details are defined in the latest version of ARINC Characteristic 714A.

== Code registration ==
Alphabet-audio frequency equivalents

A	312.6 Hz
B	346.7 Hz
C	384.6 Hz
D	426.6 Hz

E	473.2 Hz
F	524.8 Hz
G	582.1 Hz
H	645.7 Hz

J	716.1 Hz
K	794.3 Hz
L	881.0 Hz
M	977.2 Hz

P	1083.9 Hz
Q	1202.3 Hz
R	1333.5 Hz
S	1479.1 Hz

An individual aircraft is given a SELCAL code upon application to the SELCAL code registrar, Aviation Spectrum Resources, Inc. (ASRI). The code is technically assigned to the owner-operator of the aircraft rather than the aircraft itself; if an aircraft is sold, the new owners-operators must apply for a new code.

The code is a sequence of four letters, written or transmitted as an ordered two sets of two letters each (e.g. AB-CD). The letters are chosen from a subset of the Latin script comprising A through S, excluding I, N and O. The letters within a given pair are written or transmitted in alphabetical order (e.g., AB-CD is an allowable distinct SELCAL code, as is CD-AB, but CD-BA is not). A given letter can be used only once in a SELCAL code; letters may not be repeated (e.g. AB-CD is allowable, but AA-BC and AB-BC are not).

Each letter designates a specific audio tone frequency.

== Limitations ==
The rules for SELCAL code assignment, with sixteen available letters/tones, limit the number of possible allowable codes to 10,920. Additionally, SELCAL codes assigned previously use a subset of only twelve letters/tones. Therefore, more than one aircraft may be designated by the same code.

To avoid confusion from two or more aircraft using the same SELCAL code, ASRI tries to assign code duplicates to aircraft that do not usually operate in the same region of the world or on the same HF radio frequencies. However, aircraft commonly move between different geographical regions and it is now routine for two aircraft with the same SELCAL code to be found flying in the same region. Therefore, air crew always verify both SELCAL and call sign (i.e., aircraft tail registration, or telephony designator and flight identification) to be sure their aircraft is the intended recipient.

== SELCAL 32 ==
The SELCAL 32 Expansion Project was started after October 2018 to increase the number of possible allowable codes, and was approved by ICAO for full implementation in November 2022. The SELCAL 32-tones were fully launched for use by airline operators in November 2023. SELCAL 32 adds 16 new tones for a total of 32. With these new tones, up to 200.000 new unique SELCAL codes can be created. The new tones are labeled T through Z and 1 through 9, adding numeric digits to SELCAL for the first time. Since the original 16 tones are still part of SELCAL 32, it retains full backwards compatibility with existing codes and equipment.

== See also ==
- Aircraft Communication Addressing and Reporting System
- Airline teletype system
- Communications satellite
