= DO-219 =

Communications standard for air traffic control

Minimum Operational Performance Standards for ATC Two-Way Data Link Communications
- Abbreviation: DO-219
- Latest version: August 27, 1993
- Organization: RTCA SC-169
- Domain: Aviation

DO-219 is a communications standard published by RTCA, Incorporated. It contains minimum operational performance standards (MOPS) for aircraft equipment required for air traffic control (ATC) two-way data link communications (TWDL) services. TWDL Services are one element of air traffic services communication (ATSC). ATSC addressing requirements are supported by the Context Management (CM) Service. The Aeronautical Telecommunication Network (ATN) provides the media and protocols to conduct data link Air Traffic Services Communication.

== Outline of contents ==
1. Purpose and Scope
2. Performance requirements and Test Procedures
3. Installed Equipment Performance
4. Operational Characteristics
- Appendix A: ATC Two-Way Data Link Communications Message Set
- Appendix B: ATC Two-Way Data Link Communications Data Structures Glossary
- Appendix C: An Overview of the Packed encoding Rules ISO PDIS 8825-2; PER Unaligned
- Appendix D: A Guide for Encoding and Decoding the RTCA SC-169 Message Set for ATC 2-Way Data Link, According to the Packed Encoding Rules
- Appendix E: ATC Two-Way Data Link Communications Sample Messages
- Appendix F: State Table

== See also ==
- ACARS
