= STCA =

STCA may refer to:

- Canada–United States Safe Third Country Agreement, a treaty between Canada and the United States respecting eligibility of refugee claimants at their shared land border
- Short Term Conflict Alert
- STCA (Subject to Council Approval) is an abbreviation commonly used in real estate. Typically applied to "Renovators Delight" homes when for sale and stating that the existing home can be demolished and the land redeveloped.
