= High Frequency Data Link =

Communications medium for aircraft

High Frequency Data Link (HFDL) is an ACARS communications medium used to exchange data such as Aeronautical Operational Control (AOC) messages, Controller Pilot Data Link Communications (CPDLC) messages and Automatic Dependent Surveillance (ADS) messages between aircraft end-systems and corresponding ground-based HFDL ground stations. Using the unique propagation characteristics of high-frequency radio waves, the ground stations provide data link communications to properly equipped aircraft operating anywhere in the world. As a result, pilots can always communicate with someone on the ground.

Today, HFDL is an air/ground data link standard with coverage in virtually every corner of the globe, approximately 168,000,000 square miles (440,000,000 km^{2}) where aircraft are never out of touch both in the air and on the ground. There are around 15 HF ground stations (HGS) available today, and, like a canopy within a jungle, the stations provide overlap and redundancy in the unlikely event of a HGS failure. These 15 stations provide nearly complete global coverage, including both poles, and system availability is 100 percent.

== Technology ==
To use the service, an aircraft only needs a Communications Management Unit (CMU), or equivalent and an HFDL data radio. The CMU is an airborne communications router that interfaces with many aircraft communications systems including SATCOM, VHF, HFDL, FMS and others.

The design of the system allows for 4 channels per ground station. Currently, 12 stations are only using half of the designed capacity. 3 others are using 3 of the 4 designed channels. Stations are actively monitored for traffic load and can determine when additional channels needs to be added by the service providers.

Due to the digital nature of HFDL, it uses between 1/3 and 1/2 of the bandwidth that voice requires, so data can continue to be decoded when voice is unusable. This was proven during the 2003 Halloween Solar Storm when aircraft were still using HFDL on polar routes when voice was unusable.

HFDL does not require pilots to dial in specific frequencies, as with HF voice, the data radios constantly scan and select the most efficient frequency to use making operation seamless for flight crews.

== Development ==
The HFDL network and avionics are a continuing evolution. Recent innovations in avionics software developed by both Honeywell and Collins have enhanced performance and contribute to the service’s outstanding message success rates. There is continued investment in the HFDL infrastructure and there is a long term strategy in place to ensure its success.

ARINC have been quoted as saying that the system and its use have grown at rates above 20% for each of the past ten years and it now supports over sixty airlines with well over 1,200 aircraft sending more than 1 million messages a month. In 2009 eight new operating frequencies were added which brings the total number of frequencies to 167 worldwide.

== Flight planning providers ==
- ARINC
- SITA

== Literature ==
- ICAO Manual on HF Data Link (ICAO Doc 9741) and
- ITU Radio Regulations - APPENDIX 27 (REV.WRC-19) - Frequency allotment Plan for the aeronautical mobile (R) service and related information
- ITU-R Recommendation ITU-R M.1458 (05/2000) - Use of the frequency bands between 2.8-22 MHz by the aeronautical mobile (R) service for data transmission using class of emission J2D
