= DVFR =

Aviation acronym

In Canada and the United States, DVFR is an aviation acronym for Defense Visual Flight Rules. It refers to one type of flight plan that must be filed for operation within an Air Defense Identification Zone (the alternative being an IFR flight plan).

Flight rules under a DVFR plan are not substantially different from under a VFR plan, except that the pilot is required to notify Air Traffic Control prior to deviating from a DVFR plan while inside an ADIZ, and that two-way radio communication is required while inside the ADIZ.

== See also ==
- Special visual flight rules
- Instrument flight rules (IFR)
- Night visual flight rules
