= Self-organized time-division multiple access =

Self-organized time-division multiple access (STDMA or SOTDMA) is a channel access method designed by Håkan Lans, based on time-division multiplexing.

The term "self-organized" describes the manner in which time slots are assigned to users. Time-division multiple access (TDMA) divides a channel into frames, which furthermore are subdivided into a vast number of time slots. Users transmit in rapid succession, one after the other, each using their own time slot. One of the drawbacks of TDMA is that it requires a central station for slot assignment and time synchronization. STDMA proposes a method for assigning slots without the involvement of a central station. Time synchronization is usually taken care of using Coordinated Universal Time (UTC). Slot assignment is handled by each transmitter broadcasting its next slot reservation as part of the message during its current slot.

STDMA is in use by the Automatic Identification System (AIS), a standard marine short-range coastal tracking system, and is the base of the International Civil Aviation Organization VHF Data Link Mode 4.

While the method was patented, a US patent ex-parte reexamination certificate was issued in 2010 canceling all claims.
