= Irish Air Navigation Service =

Commercial semi-state company in Ireland

The Irish Air Navigation Service, trading as AirNav Ireland or AirNav na hÉireann, is the Air Navigation Service Provider of Ireland from 30 April 2023. It is a commercial company owned by the State, and has responsibility for the provision of air traffic management, aeronautical communications and related services in Irish controlled airspace. Its head office is in The Times Building, D'Olier St., in Dublin.

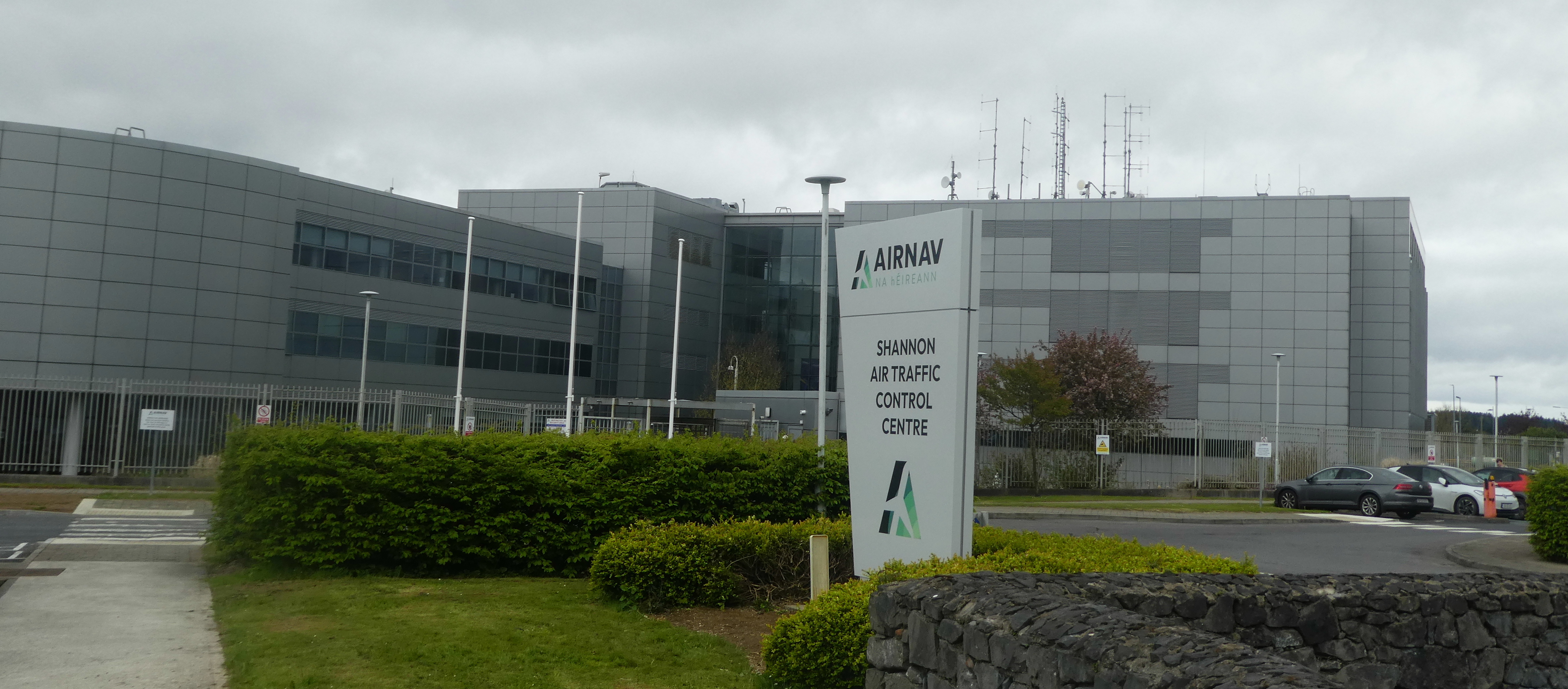
Shannon Air Traffic Control Centre

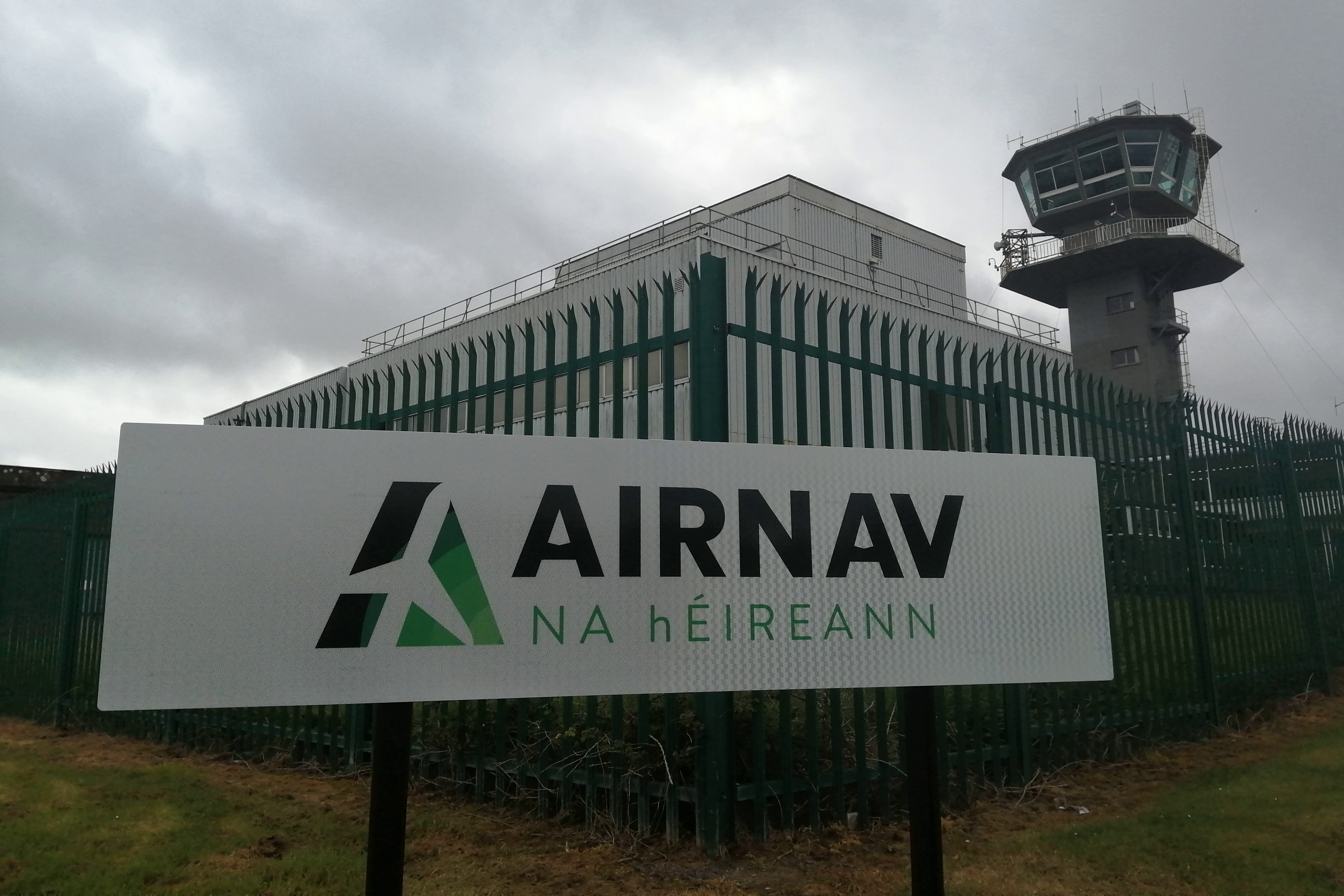
Shannon Airport Control Tower

AirNav Ireland is responsible for providing air traffic control services to Ireland's three main airports, namely Dublin, Shannon and Cork, en-route air traffic control services over Irish airspace and aeronautical communications services in Irish controlled airspace.

The previous ANSP was the Irish Aviation Authority (IAA), which still has responsibility for safety and regulatory matters. These functions were separated with the establishment of AirNav Ireland.

The air navigation services of the IAA became a new organisation called AirNav Ireland on 30 April 2023. The safety and regulatory division of the IAA merged with the Commission for Aviation Regulation on the same date to become the new single national aviation authority, retaining the name IAA.

The separation of functions of the IAA and merger with the CAR was originally planned to take place during 2021, but was delayed by parliamentary procedures. The Air Navigation and Transport Act 2022 provided for the formation of the company.
