= TopSky =

The TopSky (formerly EUROCAT) system is a computerised air traffic control and management solution developed by Thales Air Systems (formerly Thomson CSF). It utilises a distributed computing architecture and is capable of integrating geographically dispersed air traffic control units within a Flight Information Region (e.g. control towers at different airports and en route control centres) into a single coherent system.

During 2012, the Thales marketing name has been changed from Eurocat to TopSky.

== Features ==
TopSky handles a large variety of different functions required for the smooth operation of air traffic control and management. A non-exhaustive list includes:

- Surveillance data processing and track correlation (radar, ADS-B, ADS-C etc.)
- Flight plan processing
- Communication (CPDLC etc.)
- Aeronautical information data processing (NOTAMs, QNH, wind aloft etc.)
- Flow control and sequencing
- Human-machine interfacing (e.g. correlating data to generate controller's display)
- Data recording
- Controller situational awareness and alerts generation
  - Squawk Emergency (EMG), Radio Failure (RAD), Hijack (HIJ)
  - Short Term Conflict Alert (STCA), Minimum Safe Altitude Warning (MSAW), Danger Area Infringement Warning (DAIW) etc.
  - Non-Transgression Zone (NTZ) alert, DUPE Alerts, FPCF Alerts.

== Countries ==
The software is used in many countries, including:

- Algeria
- Australia
- Austria
- Belgium
- Brunei
- China
- Croatia
- Czech Republic
- Denmark
- Dominican Republic
- Egypt
- Finland
- France
- Greece
- Hungary
- Indonesia
- Ireland
- Jamaica
- Kenya
- Portugal
- Philippines
- Saudi Arabia
- Singapore
- South Africa
- Sweden
- United Arab Emirates
- United Kingdom
- Thailand
- Tanzania
