= Short-term conflict alert =

Collision alert system for air traffic controllers

Short-term conflict alert (STCA) is an automated warning system for air traffic controllers (ATCO). It is a ground-based safety net intended to assist the controller in preventing collision between aircraft by generating, in a timely manner, an alert of a potential or actual infringement of separation minima.

== Description ==
ICAO Doc 4444 requires that radar systems should provide for the display of safety-related alerts including the presentation of actual and predicted conflict. It is worth mentioning that ICAO Doc 4444 does neither provide definitions of the term STCA nor conflict alert. Instead the term STCA is ambiguously used in ATC community to identify such alerts as well as for data processing systems providing the alert function.

As an implementation STCA is part of the predictive safety net functions. It uses surveillance information derived from radars, ADS-B or multilateration as well as environmental data and optional flight plan information in order to predict the movement of aircraft. This process is usually working unnoticeably to the air traffic controller unless a (potential) separation infringement is identified. In this case STCA will generate an alarm to inform the air traffic controller about the hazardous situation identifying the conflicting aircraft. Due to the uncertainty of trajectory prediction the look ahead time of STCA system is typically limited to approx. 2 minutes. Extending the look ahead time is not beneficial as more and more nuisance alerts will be generated.

== Related systems ==
In addition to STCA, other ground-based safety net functions are typically implemented to support the ATCO. These in include

- Minimum safe altitude warning (MSAW); and
- Area proximity warning (APW), sometimes also called danger area infringement warning (DAIW).

The equivalent system on board an aircraft is TCAS. This system alerts pilots to possible conflicts, and suggests remedial actions, in the form of a climb or descent. Unlike TCAS, STCA does not normally suggest remedial action. If action is required, the controller will normally give a turn command to the aircraft, eliminating the possibility that his command will contradict that given by TCAS.

Other concepts of air safety are:

- making a flight plan and
- using airways.

== See also ==
- TopSky
