= Aeronautical operational control =

Group of applications used for communication of an aircraft

Aeronautical operational control (AOC) is a group or the entirety of applications used for communication of an aircraft with its airline or service partners on the ground. An AOC application was traditionally hosted on an ACARS MU or Communications Management Unit (CMU). AOC communication is required for the exercise of authority over the initiation, continuation, diversion or termination of flight for safety, regularity and efficiency reasons.

AOC were often user-defined, because they were only exchanged between an airline and its own aircraft; controlling both ends, there was no need for standardization.

However, by introducing airframe-defined ACARS messages (e.g. the Airbus A380) and because of the increasing need to connect airline handling partners such as fuel suppliers or de-icing companies, a need to standardize appeared. In 2007, ARINC 633 was developed to standardize these AOC messages.

== See also ==
- High Frequency Data Link
