= Irish Aviation Authority =

Commercial semi-state company in Ireland

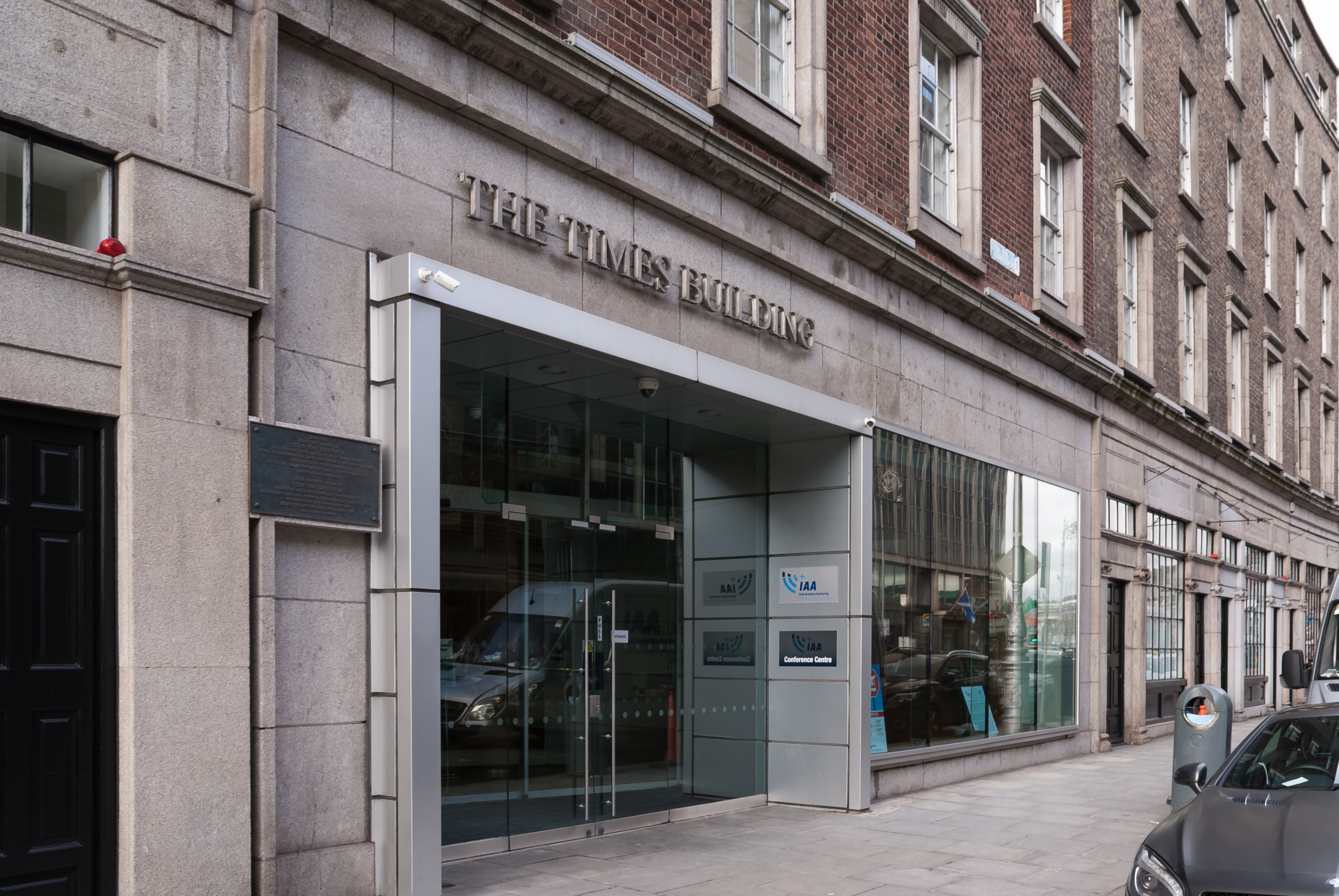
The Times Building in Dublin, headquarters of the IAA

The Irish Aviation Authority (IAA) (Irish: Údarás Eitlíochta na hÉireann) is a commercial semi-state company in Ireland responsible for the regulation of safety aspects of air travel. Its head office is in The Times Building in Dublin.

== Background ==
The authority regulates the safety standards of Irish civil aviation. The authority was originally established on 1 January 1994 under the Irish Aviation Authority Act, 1993. The new IAA was established on 30 April 2023.

== ANSP functions until 30 April 2023 ==
Until 30 April 2023, the IAA was also responsible for providing air traffic control services to Ireland's three main airports, namely Dublin, Shannon and Cork, and en-route air traffic control services over Irish airspace. On that date, the ANSP (Air Navigation Service Provider) section of the IAA became a separate organisation, Irish Air Navigation Service, trading as AirNav Ireland or AirNav na hÉireann, which now provides air traffic management and aeronautical communications services in Irish controlled airspace.

From 30 April 2023, the IAA (merged with the Commission for Aviation Regulation) remains as the civil aviation authority of Ireland, retaining the name Irish Aviation Authority.

== Background of the IAA from 1994 to 2023 ==
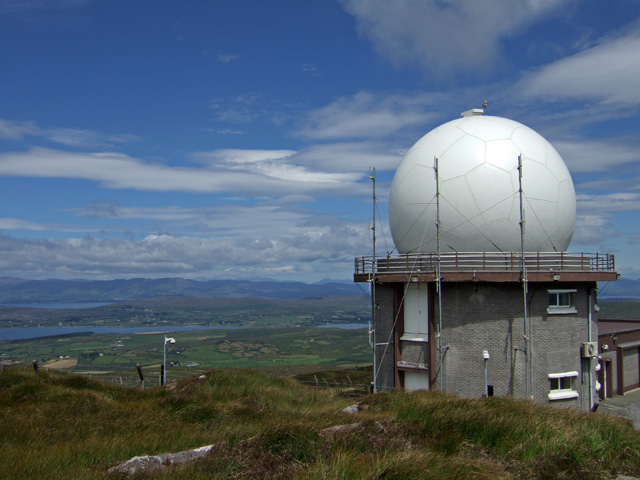
Irish Aviation Authority radar tracking installation

The authority controlled air traffic for the three major international airports in Ireland.

- Shannon – The majority of air traffic controllers in Ireland work in the Shannon ATC centre. It is from here that 80% of all flights transiting between Europe and North America are controlled. These are flights that don't touch down on Irish soil. Shannon controls these flights as far as 15 degrees west, approximately 385 kilometres off the Irish coast. From here they are handed over to Shanwick for their journey across the Atlantic Ocean.
- Dublin – There are approximately 79 air traffic controllers in Dublin. The vertical limit of Dublin's airspace is Flight Level 245 (24,500 ft). Dublin Airport is by far the busiest airport in Ireland. Estimates for 2017 show 29.6 million passengers going through the airport.
- Cork – Cork ATC provides an approach and an aerodrome service to traffic arriving and departing Cork. The Cork Control Zone has a radius of 15 nautical miles (28 km) and a vertical limit of 5,000 ft (1,500 m).

The smaller airports such as Ireland West Airport provide their own approach and aerodrome service.

In recent years, the authority has invested more than €115 million in air traffic control systems. This includes a new air traffic control centre (ATCC) at Ballycasey Cross, Shannon. Built on a Greenfield site, this ATCC became fully operational in February 2004 and replaces the ATC Centre at Shannon Airport which had been in operation since 1966. The new ATC centre houses the Shannon element of the new Air Traffic Management (ATM) system introduced in Shannon and Dublin in 2004.

The authority was also responsible for providing communications in Shanwick airspace, with NATS providing the ATC from Prestwick. Shannon Aeradio, as it is known, is based in Ballygirreen, Newmarket-on-Fergus, County Clare.

In October 2009, it was announced that the regulatory aspects of the IAA's remit would be transferred to the Dublin Transport Authority, later renamed the National Transport Authority. However, this plan never went ahead.

In July 2015, the Irish government revealed plans to purchase a long-range radar system at a cost of €10 million for the Irish Aviation Authority and Irish Defence Forces (military) to keep track of covert aircraft flying in Irish-controlled airspace, including military aircraft that do not file a flight plan and do not have their transponders switched on. Minister for Defence Simon Coveney said the increased surveillance capability would give better coverage of the Atlantic airspace over which the IAA has responsibility for civil and military aircraft.

The safety and regulatory division and the air navigation services of the IAA were split into two separate organisations on 30 April 2023. The Safety and Regulatory Division of the IAA merged with the Commission for Aviation Regulation to become the new Irish Aviation Authority. The air navigation service provider functions of the IAA were transferred to a new ANSP called AirNav Ireland.

== See also ==
- Air Accident Investigation Unit
- EASA pilot licensing
