= FANS-1/A =

Range of Future Air Navigation System products

FANS-1/A design is a range of Future Air Navigation System (FANS) products that allows aircraft to be seen by ATC in areas where radar is not practical so that aircraft separation can be maintained. FANS includes many components from human to avionics hardware and a dedicated network linking Air Traffic Control (ATC) to the flight crew via satellite and landlines. FANS 1/A consists of CPDLC and ADS-C. CPDLC allows communications between the pilot and ATC and ADS-C is an electronic contract, valid through the duration of time the aircraft is in FANS 1/A airspace, offered by ATC and accepted by the flight crew. ADS-C provides aircraft position information to ATC including heading, altitude, airspeed and position. The communications include air traffic control clearances, pilot requests, and position reporting. FANS-1 is Boeing's solution and FANS-A is the Airbus solution.

The main industry standards describing the operation of FANS-1/A products are ARINC 622 and EUROCAE ED-100/RTCA DO-258. Both the Airbus A380 and Boeing 787 have FANS-1/A capability.

ATC services are now provided to aircraft equipped with FANS-1/A in other Oceanic airspace such as the North Atlantic. Although many of FANS-1/A's known deficiencies with respect to its use in high density airspace were addressed in later versions of the product (FANS-1/A+), it has never been fully adopted for use in continental airspace.

== Certification ==
For an aircraft and the flight crew to operate in FANS airspace the avionics and flight crew must be certified. AirSatOne has a dedicated FANS 1/A test station connection to the FANS 1/A Datalink backbone which allows the company to perform functionality testing in accordance with RTCA DO-258A/ED-100A and demonstrate compliance with AC 20-140C to support FANS 1/A operational approval. The same FANS 1/A test station is also used to train pilots to operate in FANS 1/A airspace using their actual avionics equipment while safely on the ground.

== See also ==
- Future Air Navigation System (FANS)
- Controller Pilot Data Link Communications (CPDLC)
