= VHF Data Link =

Wireless data link used by aviation

The VHF Data Link or VHF Digital Link (VDL) is a means of sending information between aircraft and ground stations (and in the case of VDL Mode 4, other aircraft) over VHF.

Aeronautical VHF data links use the band 117.975–137 MHz which was assigned by the International 'T'elecommunication 'U'nion (ITU) in the ITU Radio Regulations Article 1 to the Aeronautical Mobile (R) Service or short AM(R)S.

International Standards and Recommended Practices (SARPs) and guidance material for VHF Digital Link (VDL) Mode 1 and Mode 2 were published first by the International Civil Aviation Organization (ICAO) in ICAO Annex 10, Volume III and Volume V in 1997 as a part of Amendment 72. In 2001 additional material was published in ICAO document Doc-9976, the Manual on VHF Digital Link (VDL) Mode 2.

There are ARINC standards for ACARS on VHF and other data links installed on approximately 14,000 aircraft and a range of ICAO standards defined by the AMCP in the 1990s. VDL Mode 2 is the only VDL mode being implemented operationally to support Controller Pilot Data Link Communications (CPDLC).

== ACARS on VHF ==
ACARS (Aircraft Communications Addressing and Reporting System), was introduced before VDL Mode 2. ACARS on VHF allows transmitting data with a data rate of only 2.4 kb/s. Nevertheless it is still widespread in use today (2021) for many airframes or in regions without consistent VDLM2 coverage.

== ICAO VDL Mode 1 ==
The ICAO AMCP (Aeronautical Mobile Communications Panel) defined this Mode for validation purposes. It was the same as VDL Mode 2 except that it used the same VHF link as VHF ACARS so it could be implemented using analog radios before VHF Digital Radio implementation was completed. The ICAO AMCP completed validation of VDL Modes 1&2 in 1994, after which the Mode 1 was no longer needed and was deleted from the ICAO standards.

== ICAO VDL Mode 2 ==
The ICAO VDL Mode 2 is the main version of VDL. It has been implemented in a Eurocontrol Link 2000+ program and is specified as the primary link in the EU Single European Sky rule adopted in January 2009 requiring all new aircraft flying in Europe after January 1, 2014 to be equipped with CPDLC.

In advance of CPDLC implementation, VDL Mode 2 has already been implemented in approximately 2,000 aircraft to transport ACARS messages simplifying the addition of CPDLC. Networks of ground stations providing VDL Mode 2 service have been deployed by ARINC and SITA with varying levels of coverage.

The ICAO standard for the VDL Mode 2 specifies three layers: the Subnetwork, Link, and Physical Layer. The Subnetwork Layer complies with the requirements of the ICAO Aeronautical Telecommunication Network (ATN) standard which specifies an end-to-end data protocol to be used over multiple air-ground and ground subnetworks including VDL.

The VDL Mode 2 Link Layer is made up of two sublayers: a Data Link service and a media access control (MAC) sublayer. The Data Link protocol is based on the ISO standards used for dial-up HDLC access to X.25 networks. It provides aircraft with a positive link establishment to a ground station, and defines an addressing scheme for ground stations. The MAC protocol is a version of Carrier Sense Multiple Access (CSMA).

The VDL Mode 2 Physical Layer specifies the use in a 25 kHz wide VHF channel of a modulation scheme called Differential 8-Phase-shift keying (D8PSK modulation) with a symbol rate of 10,500 symbols per second. The raw (uncoded) physical layer bit rate is thus 31.5 kilobit/second. This required the implementation of VHF digital radios.

== ICAO VDL Mode 3 ==
The ICAO standard for VDL Mode 3 defines a protocol providing aircraft with both data and digitized voice communications that was defined by the US FAA with support from Mitre. The digitized voice support made the Mode 3 protocol much more complex than VDL Mode 2. The data and digitized voice packets go in Time Division Multiple Access (TDMA) slots assigned by ground stations. The FAA implemented a prototype system around 2003 but did not manage to convince airlines to install VDL Mode 3 avionics and in 2004 abandoned its implementation.

== ICAO VDL Mode 4 ==
The ICAO standard for VDL Mode 4 specifies a protocol enabling aircraft to exchange data with ground stations and other aircraft.

VDL Mode 4 uses a protocol (Self-organized Time Division Multiple Access, STDMA, invented by Swede Håkan Lans in 1988) that allows it to be self-organizing, meaning no master ground station is required. This made it much simpler to implement than VDL Mode 3.

In November 2001 this protocol was adopted by ICAO as a global standard. Its primary function was to provide a VHF frequency physical layer for ADS-B transmissions. However it was overtaken as the link for ADS-B by the Mode S radar link operating in the 1,090 MHz band which was selected as the primary link by the ICAO Air Navigation Conference in 2003.

The VDL Mode 4 medium can also be used for air-ground exchanges. It is best used for short message transmissions between a large number of users, e.g., providing situational awareness, Digital Aeronautical Information Management, etc.

European Air Traffic Management modernization trials have implemented ADS-B and air-ground exchanges using VDL Mode 4 systems. However, on air transport aircraft the operational implementations of ADS-B will use the Mode S link and of CPDLC will use VDL Mode 2.

== Frequency use ==
The European Frequency Management Manual of the International Civil Aviation Organization, ICAO contains, among other things, the following regulations for the use of frequency channels for the VHF Data-Link:

- ACARS: Channels 131.525, 131.725 and 131.825 MHz
- VDL Mode 2: 12 channels are available in the band 136.700 – 136.975 MHz with a spacing of 25 kHz are reserved for VDL Mode 2. Channel 136.975 serves as Common Signalling Channel (CSC).
- VDL Mode 4: Channel 136.925 can in some States alternatively used for Mode-4. (This is however very rare.)

Channel Table for Mode 2
Channel	Remark
136.700	AIR
136.725	AIR
136.750	AIR
136.775	AIR
136.800	AIR
136.825	GND
136.850	AIR
136.875	GND
136.900	AIR
136.925	GND
136.950	AIR
136.975	CSC, AIR & GND

Additional remarks:

- For VDL Mode 2 ground stations it is being distinguished between stations serving only airports (i.e. aircraft are on ground, indicated as 'GND') and stations which serve airspaces (i.e. aircraft are airborne, indicated as 'AIR')
- The Common Signalling Channel (CSC) is being used for AIR and GND
- VDL Mode 2 ground stations, which are using adjacent channels need to be at least separated 3 Nautical Miles (NM) in order to avoid interference. By this means the guard-band channels (unused channels in between channel used for VDL) which were used until 2022 can be avoided.
