= ADDML =

Standard describing a collection of data files

Archival Data Description Mark-up Language (ADDML) is a standard describing a collection of data files. The standard was originally developed by the National Archives of Norway (NAN), and existed in several different versions until a constant form was reached with 8.2, the present de facto standard.

== Scope ==
ADDML is a standard describing a collection of data files organised as flat files. A flat file in this context is a file existing as plain text, internally organised either by fixed positioning or delimiter separation. Such a collection of files is called a dataset. A file containing the description of a dataset is called a dataset description. It is also possible to describe other types of files, but not in detail. This can be used to describe relations between files and metadata about them.

== Usage ==
ADDML serves several purposes. Its main task is to describe the technical structure of a dataset designated for repository submissions. Today’s standard sees an extension of its original purpose, but the technical structure remains, making it possible to describe a flat file structure when it is to be exchanged from one system to another (and not only for archival purposes).

Version 8.3 additionally facilitates the description of other types of files, but not in detail, since other standards available are already handling this kind of description. Emphasis in the implementation of describing other files than flat files in ADDML has been put on the option of describing the file types, the relation between them and so forth. Both the reference part and the data objects part are generic, making an expansion possible according to individual needs. In addition, the option of including properties has been developed and implemented from version 8.0 and on.

The implementation of ADDML requires limitations. The use of the generic parts of the standard depends on individual definitions.
