= Airline teletype system =

Communications system in the airline industry

The airline teletype system uses teleprinters, which are electro-mechanical typewriters that can communicate typed messages from point to point through simple electric communications channels, often just pairs of wires. The most modern form of these devices is fully electronic and uses a screen instead of a printer.

== Historical development ==
The airline industry began using teletypewriter technology in the early 1920s utilizing radio stations located at 10 airfields in the United States. The US Post Office and other US government agencies used these radio stations for transmitting telegraph messages. It was during this period that the first federal teletypewriter system was introduced in the United States to allow weather and flight information to be exchanged between air traffic facilities. While the use of physical teletypes is almost extinct, the message formats and switching concepts remain similar. In 1929, Aeronautical Radio Incorporated (ARINC) was formed to manage radio frequencies and license allocation in the United States, as well as to support the radio stations that were used by the emerging airlines, a role ARINC still fulfils today. ARINC is a private company originally owned by many of the world's airlines including American Airlines, Continental Airlines, British Airways, Air France, and SAS; it was acquired by Collins Aerospace in December 2013.

In 1949, the Société Internationale de Télécommunication Aeronautique (SITA) was formed as a cooperative by 11 airlines: Air France, KLM, Sabena, Swissair, TWA, British European Airways, British Overseas Airways Corporation, British South American Airways, Swedish AB Aerotransport, Danish Det Danske Luftfartselskab A/S, and Norwegian Det Norske Luftfartselskap. Their aim was to enable airlines to be able to use the existing communications facilities in the most efficient manner.

Morse code was the general means of relaying information between air communications stations prior to World War II. Generally, it was only necessary to relay a message between one or two stations. After World War II, there was an increase in the number of commercial aircraft operating, and these aircraft were capable of flying greater distances than in the past. As a result, the Aeronautical Fixed Telecommunication Network (AFTN) was implemented worldwide as a means of relaying the air traffic communications, sometimes through the use of radioteletype which had become common among military forces in the 1940s.

The airline industry continues to use teletypewriter messages over ARINC, SITA or AFTN networks as a medium for communicating via messages to exchange operational information. Most teletypewriter messages are machine-generated by automatic processes. IATA standardised teletype message formats throughout the airline industry.

Since 2010 there have been initiatives in the industry to tackle the high cost of the existing Type B network by deploying secured peer-to-peer solutions, e.g. EDIfly, developed by Innovative Software SARL in Luxembourg and used by companies like Cargolux, TAP, AirBridgeCargo, Garuda Indonesia, China Airlines, Air Asia, HACTL, Swissport etc. Such solutions allow users to exchange unrestricted amounts of Type B data over the public internet while maintaining all existing addressing schemes and message identification. Web-based technology also enables the community to expand the usage and removes shortcomings in the existing Type B exchange (limited to 5000 characters). The success of such initiatives will improve the processing of operational data for all stakeholders in the industry and provide expanded usage until newer technology like XML become the norm following IATAs decision to sunset CargoIMP in 2014 in operational systems of all stakeholders in the aviation scene across all continents.

== Example message, IATA Type B ==
QD AAABBCC                    - to (IATA destination address) (QD priority=deferred, QU priority = urgent, QK priority = normal)
.XXXYYZZ 111301               - from (IATA origin address + timestamp DDtttt, DD=day of month, tttt in UTC)
ASM                           - IATA type (keyword). Identifies type of message (rest of the message conforms to the format for this type. ASM=Adhoc Schedule(-change) Message)
UTC                           - Time mode (Coordinated Universal Time). UTC or LOCAL
27SEP03899E001/TSTF DL Y      - Message Reference line
NEW                           - ASM subtype (Action Identifier)
BA667/13APR                   - Flight and date of flight;
J 319 C1M25VVA4C26            - fleet & equipment information
LHR1340 BCN1610               - Station/time for depart & arrival
LHRQQQ 99/1                   - Route information. 99 is the passenger departure terminal code
QQQBCN 98/A                   - Route information. 98 is the passenger arrival terminal code
QQQQQQ 906/PAYDIV B           - Route information. 
LHRQQQ 999/1                  - Route information. 999 is the aircraft arrival terminal code
QQQBCN 998/A                  - Route information. 998 is the aircraft departure terminal code
SI                            - Other supplementary information (free text)

IATA addresses consist of 7 characters divided into the Origin IATA Code (AAA), a function indicator (BB), and the airline designator (CC). For example, HKGFFLH would be the Cargo Office (FF) of Lufthansa (LH) in Hong Kong (HKG). Auxiliary airline designators (XH) have been created to allow other stakeholders to share in the communication beyond the airlines, e.g. Ground Handlers, Charter Brokers, Authorities (Immigration, Customs, Police) etc.

In January 2026 the UK-based consultancy T2RL published a report deliberating on the usage of Type B messaging in the context of the future use of such protocol in the context of the IATA initiative OneOrder, which would see a major shift in the way airlines communicate with its customers and stakeholders along the internal information supply-chain.

An AFTN Teletype message always has an 8-character address.

== Order of transmission ==
The order of transmission of messages on a given circuit is determined by their priority codes:

Level 1
Messages with priority codes SS, QS, or QC. These are handled before all other messages.
Level 2
Messages with priority codes QU or QX. These are handled before messages of levels 3 and 4.
Level 3
Messages with a QK code, a Q code other than QS, QC, QU, QX, and QD, or no priority code. These are handled before messages of level 4.
Note: Messages with a priority code which starts with any other letter than Q (with the exception of SS) are treated as having no priority code.
Level 4
Messages with priority code QD. These are deferred until no messages of levels 1, 2, or 3 are waiting for transmission. However, level 4 messages are delivered not later than the morning following the day they were handed in for transmission.

== See also ==
- ACARS
