= Santa Maria Oceanic Control =

Atlantic Ocean air traffic control area

Santa Maria Oceanic Control is an air traffic control area over the Atlantic Ocean. Santa Maria Flight information region, also known as FIR, is Europe's largest and one of the largest in the world. It is based at Santa Maria Airport, on Santa Maria Island in the Portuguese autonomous region of the Azores. Covering the southeastern part of the North Atlantic Ocean, Santa Maria FIR is on the key routes of most of the flights from Europe to Central and South America.

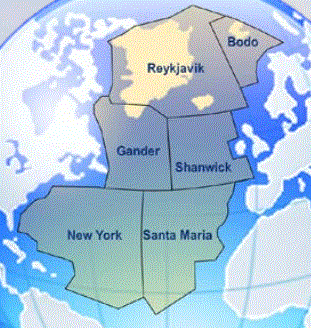
Oceanic Control Areas over North Atlantic

In the middle of the FIR, the nine Azores islands attract thousands of tourists and further increase the traffic in Santa Maria FIR. The airports are also known for saving a considerable amount of money and lives by serving as an en-route alternate airport for many transatlantic flights.
