= Air Defense Identification Zone (North America) =

Air defense identification zone

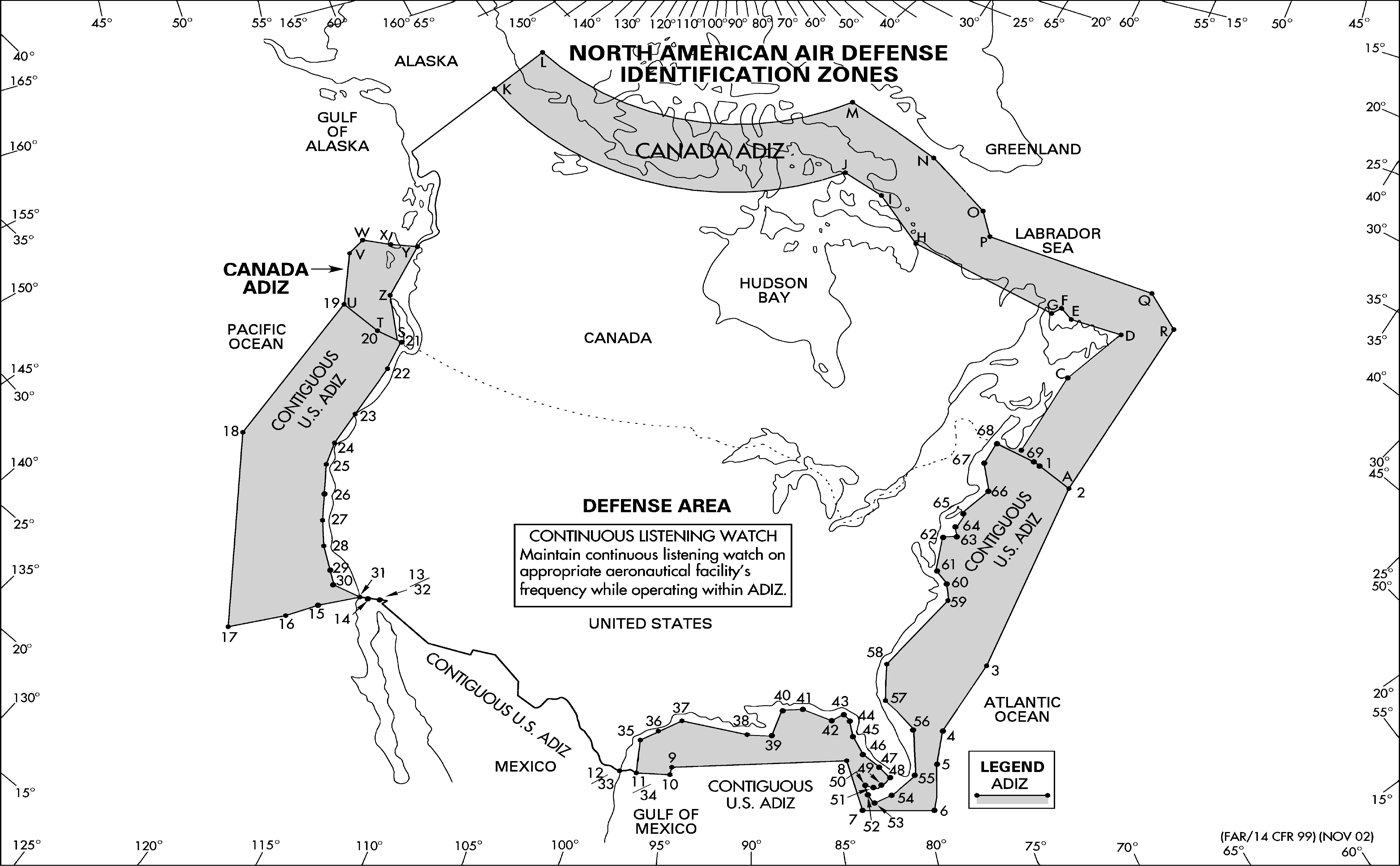
ADIZ boundaries for the United States and Canada as of 2018.

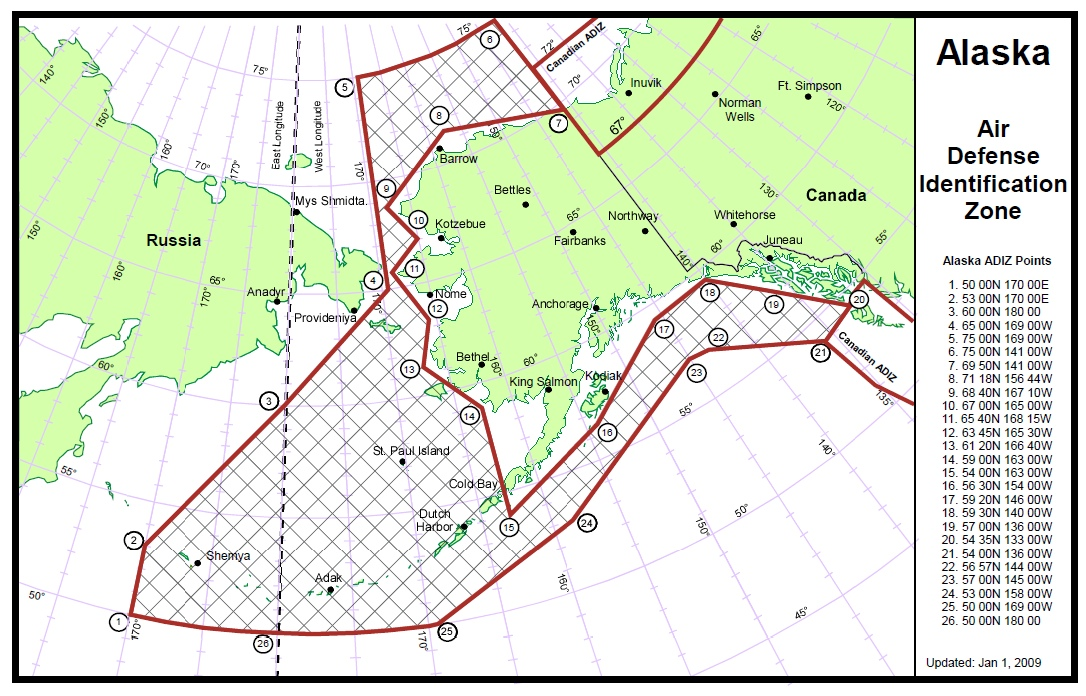
ADIZ boundaries for Alaska.

The Air Defense Identification Zone of North America is an air defense identification zone (ADIZ) that covers the airspace surrounding the United States and Canada – in which the ready identification, location, and control of civil aircraft over land or water is required in the interest of national security. This ADIZ is jointly administered by the civilian air traffic control authorities and the militaries of both nations, under the auspices of the North American Aerospace Defense Command (NORAD). The Federal Aviation Administration (FAA) handles the requests of international aircraft and Transport Canada handles Canadian requests. Any aircraft flying in these zones without authorization may be identified as a threat and treated as an enemy aircraft, potentially leading to interception by fighter aircraft.

An aircraft entering an ADIZ is required to radio its planned course, destination, and any additional details about its trip through the ADIZ to a higher authority, typically an air traffic controller. The aircraft must also be equipped with a radar transponder.

== History ==
With the outbreak of World War II, the United States asserted control of coastal airspace in 1940, and this took on a sense of urgency after the Japanese attack at Pearl Harbor. However, by 1943 the Axis powers no longer posed a severe threat to the safety of North America. With the outbreak of the Korean War, the Air Force placed its forces on alert and uncovered major weaknesses in the coordination of domestic defense units. An air defense command and control structure was developed in 1950, creating five air defense identification zones around North America. If radio interrogation failed to identify an aircraft in the ADIZ, the Air Force launched interceptor aircraft to identify the intruder visually. The air defense system reached its peak in 1962, however with the deployment of the SS-6 ICBM in the USSR, strategic threats shifted overwhelmingly to ICBM attacks, and bomber intrusions were considered to be less of a threat.

The ADIZ was focused on aircraft approaching primarily from the Soviet Union, but on October 26, 1971, a Cuban aircraft landed in New Orleans after flying completely undetected through American airspace. Publicity and political pressure from Louisiana Congressman Felix Edward Hébert forced the Air Force to establish the Southeast Air Defense Sector and open a radar network along the Gulf coast. In the 1980s with the rise of the war on drugs, this ADIZ took on a dual role of controlling drug smuggling from Latin America.

The role of the ADIZ diminished significantly in the 1990s with political changes in Russia and the reduction and attrition of Russian strategic aviation forces, but gained renewed importance during the following decade in the wake of the September 11 attacks, in which long-range aircraft on domestic flights were used against domestic targets – the renewed importance placed on the ADIZ was despite the fact that none of the aircraft involved in the September 11 attacks crossed the ADIZ.

== United States ==
The United States formally defines an ADIZ in the Code of Federal Regulations: 14 CFR Part 99. The ADIZ forms a transition zone in which aircraft come under positive identification and control by air traffic and defense authorities. With regards to applicability of the law, 14 CFR 99.1 states "This subpart prescribes rules for operating civil aircraft in a defense area, or into, within, or out of the United States through an Air Defense Identification Zone (ADIZ), designated in subpart B".

Moreover, the U.S. Navy's Commander's Handbook on the Law of Naval Operations states the ADIZ applies only to commercial aircraft intending to enter U.S. sovereign airspace, with a basis in international law of "the right of a nation to establish reasonable conditions of entry into its territory". The manual specifically instructs U.S. military aircraft to ignore the ADIZ of other states when operating in coastal areas:

The United States does not recognize the right of a coastal nation to apply its ADIZ procedures to foreign aircraft not intending to enter national airspace nor does the United States apply its ADIZ procedures to foreign aircraft not intending to enter U.S. airspace. Accordingly, U.S. military aircraft not intending to enter national airspace should not identify themselves or otherwise comply with ADIZ procedures established by other nations, unless the United States has specifically agreed to do so.

A U.S. Air Force university dissertation states:

These regulations do not pertain to military aircraft, but to enter US airspace, without inducing the scrambling of fighter interceptors, these rules must be complied with and followed. The US does not claim sovereignty over these zones per se, but does closely monitor and request information of all objects entering the zone.

In 2008 United States Northern Command commander Victor E. Renuart, Jr. said that although "we never let an unidentified aircraft come into our airspace" in a "post-9/11 world" and "determine who they are and what they’re doing," "if it is a Russian aircraft on a training mission, we allow them to continue to do their job."

== Canada ==
The Canadian portion of the North American ADIZ is split into two parts: a western zone covering the approaches from the Pacific Ocean to British Columbia and a northeastern zone stretching from the Beaufort Sea in the Arctic Ocean to the Scotian Shelf in the Atlantic Ocean. These zones serve as national defence boundaries for aerial incursions into Canadian sovereign airspace. Any aircraft that wishes to fly in or through the boundary must file either a Defense Visual Flight Rules (DVFR) flight plan or an Instrument Flight Rules (IFR) flight plan before crossing the ADIZ. The aircraft must have an operational radar transponder and maintain two-way radio contact while approaching and crossing the North American ADIZ.

Before May 2018, the Canadian ADIZ did not reach beyond 66° N, leaving parts of its sovereign airspace over the Canadian Arctic Archipelago uncovered. With renewed interest in Arctic sovereignty, Canada has since adjusted its ADIZ to encompass all of its airspace and the approaches thereof whilst under the initiative of Defence Minister Harjit Sajjan.

== Guam ==
The Federal regulation governing ADIZ areas also provides for an ADIZ around Guam. Though like Puerto Rico it is an unincorporated United States territory, the island is home to Andersen Air Force Base, which is one of two major U.S. Air Force strategic bomber bases in the Asia Pacific region, the other being Diego Garcia which is actually on (disputed) British territory.

== Washington, D.C. ==
The Washington Air Defense Identification Zone (surrounds the National Capital Region, which is composed of counties of states in the immediate vicinity of the District of Columbia, plus the city of Baltimore) was created in 2003 though some sources refer to it as being created in response to the September 11 attacks. The reason for this confusion is that there are two other sets of flight restrictions over Washington, D.C. besides the DC ADIZ (Washington, DC Metropolitan Area Flight Restricted Zone, FRZ, & Special Federal Aviation Regulation 94, SFAR 94 or just plain Special Flight Rules Area, a zone which envelopes general aviation airports centered around Ronald Reagan airport) established for the purpose. This ADIZ, however, shared none of the regulatory similarity with the border area ADIZes. This airspace was subsequently renamed the DC Flight Restricted Zone and Special Flight Rules Area to avoid confusion.
