= Håkan Lans =

Swedish inventor (born 1947)

- Born: Anders Håkan Lans; 2 November 1947 (age 78); Stockholm, Sweden
- Occupation: Inventor

Anders Håkan Lans (born 2 November 1947) is a Swedish inventor, employed by the Swedish National Defence Research Institute (FOA), and then Stockholm University whose primary contribution is the Self-Organized Time Division Multiple Access (STDMA) datalink technology used in Automatic Identification System (AIS) for vehicle navigation.

Lans has won many notable Swedish honors for his inventions. Lans is also known for various ultimately unsuccessful legal disputes over his computer-related patents.

== STDMA ==
Håkan Lans is the designer of a tracking system which makes use of a Self-Organized Time Division Multiple Access (STDMA) datalink. The STDMA datalink is currently in use in Automatic Identification System (AIS). AIS is a short range coastal tracking system which is mandatory aboard international voyaging ships with gross tonnage (GT) of 300 or more tons, and all passenger ships regardless of size.

STDMA is also in use as one of the three physical layer models proposed for Automatic dependent surveillance-broadcast (ADS-B), a cooperative surveillance technique for air traffic control. Lans's protocol is used for ADS-B in Sweden.

For his STDMA invention, Lans was nominated for the 2007 European Inventor Award, though he did not win. Lans also won the The STDMA patent was awarded to Lans in 1996, but a US patent ex-parte reexamination certificate was issued in 2010 canceling all claims.

== Computer graphics ==
In the late 1960s, Lans invented a graphics tablet with a handheld puck. He sold the technology to Houston Instruments, which marketed the device as the HIpad in 1971. Some thereby claim Lans to be the inventor of the computer mouse, despite others making similar inventions independently several years earlier. In 1996 Lans received the highest award of the Swedish Royal Institute of Technology for his tablet puck.

Lans holds a patent on a memory controller for a framebuffer: "Data processing system and apparatus for color graphics display". Framebuffers with memory controllers had been in common use for years at the time of his 1979 patent filing. In 1997 Lans as an individual sued eleven companies for allegedly infringing his patent. The eleven cases were soon combined. The merits of the case were never heard, however, because the defendants, led by Digital Equipment Corporation, counterclaimed that the patent had been assigned to Uniboard AB, a patent holding company wholly owned by Lans. Lans lost the case and was ordered to pay defendants' legal fees, a ruling that was upheld on appeal. The subsequent attempted suit by Uniboard AB failed because the patent had expired ten months before the suit.

These legal failures led to a dispute between Lans and his attorneys, who Lans sued for misconduct. The attorneys' defense was that they had not been told about the transfer to Uniboard AB. This suit was settled in April 2012.

In 1984 Lans patented a color calligraphic photo plotter, though it was never mass produced. Despite color displays, color frame buffers, and color calligraphic displays already being common prior to 1984, Lans insists that his filings constitute the invention of color computer graphics.

== Recognition ==
Lans received the award Inventor of the Year in Sweden in 1990, the Swedish Academy of Engineering Sciences' gold medal in 1993, The International Seatrade Award in 1993, the Polhem Prize in 1995, KTH's grand prize in 1996, the Flight Aerospace Industry Award in 1997, the Swedish Society of Aeronautics and Astronautics Thulin Medal in gold in 1999, was appointed the International Swede of the Year in 2000, was appointed an honorary doctor of technology at Uppsala University in 2001, in 2002 received H. M. The King's Medal, 8th size with high blue ribbon and the André Prize from the Swedish Patent and Registration Office in 2003.
