= Peterborough and District Labour Council =

The Peterborough and District Labour Council (PDLC) is the central body of union locals in Peterborough County, Ontario, Canada, that are affiliated with the Canadian Labour Congress (CLC). The council also includes CLC-affiliated locals in Omemee, a community within Kawartha Lakes. As of 2010, the PDLC includes thirty-eight locals and represents over six thousand workers.
