= Future Air Navigation System =

Avionics system

The Future Air Navigation System (FANS) is an avionics system which provides direct data link communication between the pilot and the air traffic controller. The communications include air traffic control clearances, pilot requests and position reporting. In the FANS-B equipped Airbus A320 family aircraft, an Air Traffic Services Unit (ATSU) and a VHF Data Link radio (VDR3) in the avionics rack and two data link control and display units (DCDUs) in the cockpit enable the flight crew to read and answer the controller–pilot data link communications (CPDLC) messages received from the ground.

== Overview of FANS ==
The world's air traffic control system still uses components defined in the 1940s following the 1944 meeting in Chicago which launched the creation of the International Civil Aviation Organization (ICAO). This traditional ATC system uses analog radio systems for aircraft Communication, navigation and surveillance (CNS).

Air traffic control's ability to monitor aircraft was being rapidly outpaced by the growth of flight as a mode of travel. In an effort to improve aviation communication, navigation, surveillance, and air traffic management ICAO, standards for a future system were created. This integrated system is known as the Future Air Navigation System (FANS) and allows controllers to play a more passive monitoring role through the use of increased automation and satellite-based navigation.

In 1983, ICAO established the special committee on the Future Air Navigation System (FANS), charged with developing the operational concepts for the future of air traffic management (ATM). The FANS report was published in 1988 and laid the basis for the industry's future strategy for ATM through digital CNS using satellites and data links. Work then started on the development of the technical standards needed to realize the FANS Concept.

In the early 1990s, the Boeing Company announced a first generation FANS product known as FANS-1. This was based on the early ICAO technical work for automatic dependent surveillance (ADS) and controller–pilot data link communications (CPDLC), and implemented as a software package on the flight management computer of the Boeing 747-400. It used existing satellite based ACARS communications (Inmarsat Data-2 service) and was targeted at operations in the South Pacific Oceanic region. The deployment of FANS-1 was originally justified by improving route choice and thereby reducing fuel burn.

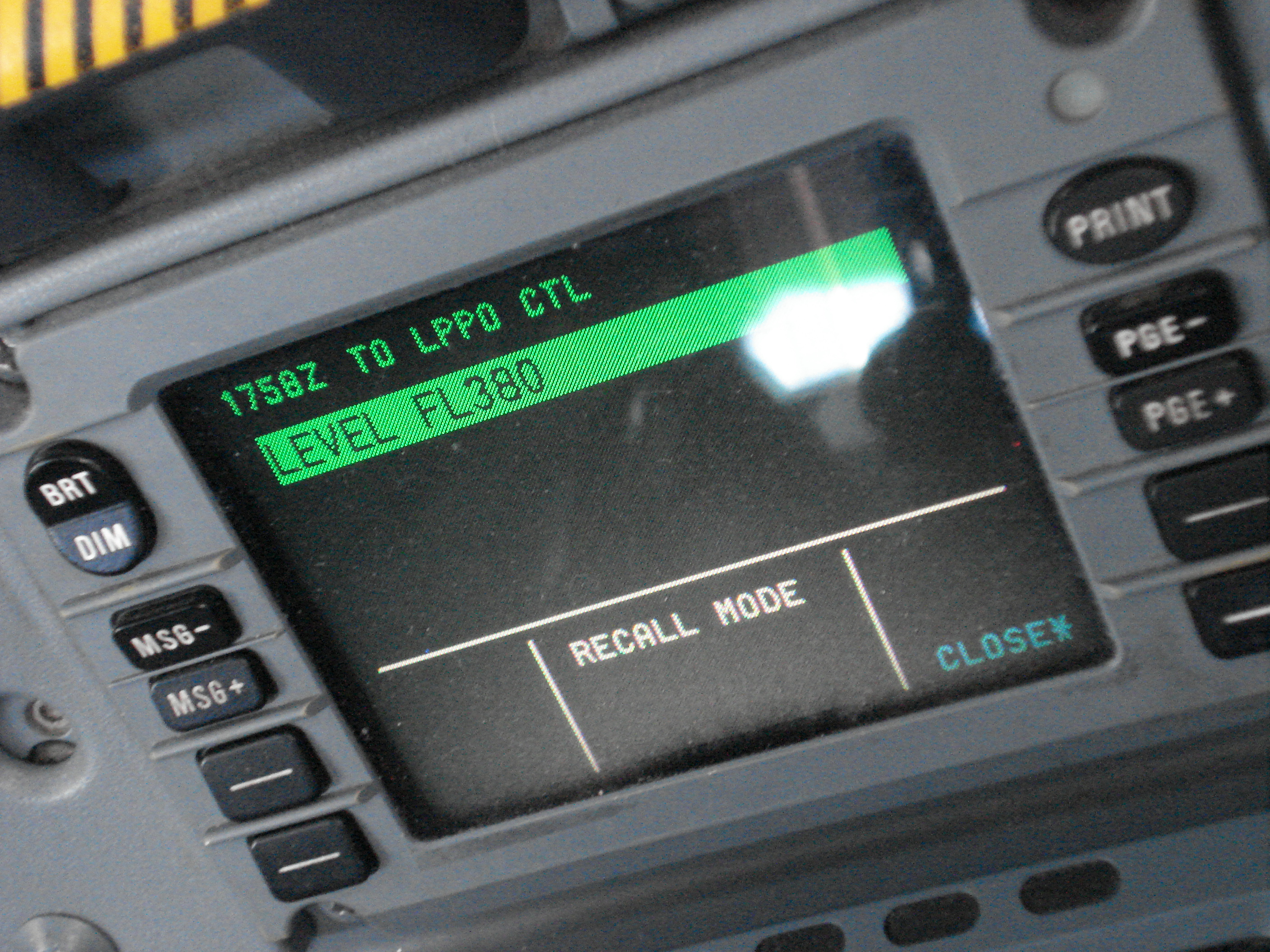
The datalink control and display unit (DCDU) on an Airbus A330, the pilot interface for sending and receiving CPDLC messages.

A similar product (FANS-A) was later developed by Airbus for the A340 and A330. Boeing also extended the range of aircraft supported to include the Boeing 777 and 767. Together, the two products are collectively known as FANS-1/A. The main industry standards describing the operation of the FANS-1/A products are ARINC 622 and EUROCAE ED-100/RTCA DO-258. Both the new Airbus A380 and Boeing 787 have FANS-1/A capability.

ATC services are now provided to FANS 1/A equipped aircraft in other oceanic airspaces, such as the North Atlantic. However, although many of FANS-1/A's known deficiencies with respect to its use in high density airspace were addressed in later versions of the product (FANS-1/A+), it has never been fully adopted for use in continental airspace. The ICAO work continued after FANS-1 was announced, and continued to develop the CNS/ATM concepts. The ICAO standard for CPDLC using the Aeronautical Telecommunications Network (ATN) is preferred for continental airspace and is currently being deployed in the core European Airspace by the EUROCONTROL Agency under the LINK2000+ Programme. Mandatory carriage of the ICAO compliant system is now the subject of an Implementing Rule (for aircraft flying above FL280) issued by the European Commission. This rule accommodates the use of FANS-1/A by long haul aircraft. All other airspace users must be ICAO compliant.

Several vendors provide ICAO ATN/CPDLC compliant products. The Airbus ICAO compliant product for the A320 family is known as FANS-B. Rockwell Collins, Honeywell and Spectralux provide ICAO compliant products for Boeing aircraft, such as the Boeing 737 and 767, and the Boeing 787 will also support ICAO ATN/CPDLC compliant communications. The main standards describing the operation of ICAO compliant products are the ICAO Technical Manual, ICAO Docs 9705 and 9896, Eurocae ED-110B/RTCA DO-280B and Eurocae ED-120/RTCA DO-290.

== Background ==
Aircraft are operated using two major methods; positive control and procedural control.

Positive control is used in areas which have radar and so is commonly referred to as radar control. The controller "sees" the airplanes in the control area and uses VHF voice to provide instructions to the flight crews to ensure separation. Because the position of the aircraft is updated frequently and VHF voice contact timely, separation standards (the distance by which one aircraft must be separated from another) are less. This is because the air traffic controller can recognize problems and issue corrective directions to multiple airplanes in a timely fashion. Separation standards are what determine the number of airplanes which can occupy a certain volume of airspace.

Procedural control is used in areas (oceanic or land) which do not have radar. The FANS concept was developed to improve the safety and efficiency of airplanes operating under procedural control. This method uses time-based procedures to keep aircraft separated. The separation standard is determined by the accuracy of the reported positions, frequency of position reports, and timeliness of communication with respect to intervention. Non-FANS procedural separation uses Inertial Navigation Systems for position, flight crew voice reports of position (and time of next waypoint), and High Frequency radio for communication. The INS systems have error introduced by drifting after initial alignment. This error can approach 10 nmi (19 km).

HF radio communication involves contacting an HF operator who then transcribes the message and sends it to the appropriate ATC service provider. Responses from the ATC Service Provider go to the HF radio operator who contacts the airplane. The voice quality of the connection is often poor, leading to repeated messages. The HF radio operator can also be saturated with requests for communication. This leads to procedures which keep airplanes separated by as much as 100 nmi (190 km) laterally, 10 minutes in trail, and 4,000 ft (1,200 m) in altitude. These procedures reduce the number of airplanes which can operate in a given airspace. If market demand pushes airlines to operate at the same time on a given route, this can lead to airspace congestion, which is handled by delaying departures or separating the airplanes by altitude. The latter can lead to very inefficient operation due to longer flying times and increased fuel burn.

== ATC using FANS ==
The FANS concept involves improvements to Communication, navigation and surveillance (CNS).

=== Communication improvements ===
This involved a transition from voice communications to digital communications. Specifically ACARS was used as the communication medium. This allowed other application improvements. An application was hosted on the airplane known as controller–pilot data link communications (CPDLC). This allows the flight crew to select from a menu of standard ATC communications, send the message, and receive a response. A peer application exists on the ground for the air traffic controller. They can select from a set of messages and send communications to the airplane. The flight crew will respond with a WILCO, STANDBY, or REJECT. The current standard for message delivery is under 60 seconds one way.

=== Navigation improvements ===
This involves a transition from inertial navigation to satellite navigation using GNSS satellites. This also introduced the concept of actual navigation performance (ANP). Previously, flight crews would be notified of the system being used to calculate the position (radios, or inertial systems alone). Because of the deterministic nature of the satellites (constellation geometry), the navigation systems can calculate the worst case error based on the number of satellites tuned and the geometry of those satellites. (Note: it can also characterize the potential errors in other navigation modes as well). So, the improvement not only provides the airplane with a much more accurate position, it also provides an alert to the flight crew should the actual navigation performance not satisfy the required navigation performance (RNP).

=== Surveillance improvements ===
This involves the transition from voice reports (based on inertial position) to automatic digital reports. The application is known as ADS-C (automatic dependent surveillance, contract). The flight crew has no setup-related workload, all work happens between the air traffic controller and the aircraft's systems: an air traffic controller can set up a "contract" (software arrangement) with the airplane's navigational system, to automatically send a position report on a specified periodic basis – every 5 minutes, for example. The controller can also set up a deviation contract, which would automatically send a position report if a certain lateral deviation was exceeded.

=== FANS procedural control ===
The improvements to CNS allow new procedures which reduce the separation standards for FANS controlled airspace. In the South Pacific, they are targeting 30/30 (this is 30 nmi (56 km) lateral and 30 nmi (56 km) in trail). This makes a huge difference in airspace capacity.

== History ==
=== ICAO ===
The International Civil Aviation Organization (ICAO) first developed the high level concepts starting with the initiation of the Special Committee on Future Air Navigation Systems in 1983. The final report was released in 1991 with a plan released in 1993.

=== Pacific engineering trials ===
FANS as we know it today had its beginning in 1991 with the Pacific Engineering Trials (PET). During these trials, airplanes installed applications in their ACARS units which would automatically report positions. These trials demonstrated the potential benefits to the airlines and airspace managers.

=== Implementation ===
United Airlines, Cathay Pacific, Qantas, and Air New Zealand approached the Boeing Company in 1993 and requested that Boeing support the development of a FANS capability for the 747-400 airplane. Boeing worked with the airlines to develop a standard which would control the interface between FANS-capable airplanes and air traffic service providers. The development of the FANS-capable aircraft systems proceeded simultaneously with the ATC ground system improvements necessary to make it work. These improvements were certified (using a QANTAS airplane VH-OJQ) on June 20, 1995.

Both Boeing and Airbus continue to further develop their FANS implementations, Boeing on FANS-2 and Airbus on FANS-B. In the interim, Airbus came out with some enhancements to FANS-A, now referred to as FANS-A+. Various ground systems have been built, mainly by ATC organizations, to interoperate with FANS-1/A.

=== FANS interoperability team ===
The FANS interoperability team (FIT) was initiated in the South Pacific in 1998. The purpose of this team is to monitor the performance of the end-to-end system, identify problems, assign problems and assure they are solved. The members include airframe manufacturers, avionics suppliers, communication service providers, and air navigation service providers. Since this time, other regions have initiated FIT groups.

== Service providers ==
Customers that operate aircraft need to get their FANS 1/A capable aircraft connected to both the ATN (Aeronautical Telecommunication Network) and to the Iridium and/or Inmarsat Satellite network. Commercial aircraft operators typically get their long haul fleet connected and have dedicated personnel to monitor and maintain the satellite and ground link while business aircraft and military aircraft operators contact companies like AirSatOne to commission the system for the first time, conduct functionality testing and to provide ongoing support. AirSatOne provide advanced FANS 1/A services through their Flight Deck Connect portfolio of products. Flight Deck Connect includes a connection to the Iridium and/or Inmarsat satellites for FANS 1/A (via Datalink), and Safety Voice Services, along with ancillary services (AFIS/ACARS) such as weather information, engine/airframe health and fault reports.

== Operational approval ==
Some of the more advanced service providers such as AirSatOne and ARINC offer FANS 1/A testing services. When an aircraft is outfitted with FANS 1/A equipment either through the Type Certificate or STC process the equipment must demonstrate compliance with AC 20-140B for operational approval. As an example AirSatOne offers testing through the satellite and ATN network to support FANS 1/A functionality in accordance with RTCA DO-258A/ED-100A and provides test reports to meet the requirements of RTCA DO-258A/ED-100A, RTCA DO-306/ED-122 and FAA Advisory Circular AC 20-140B. AirSatOne also provides first time system commissioning on each aircraft, troubleshooting testing and pre-flight maintenance checks to test FANS 1/A functionality either monthly or prior to flight in the FANS environment.

== Milestones ==
On June 20, 1995, a Qantas B747-400 (VH-OJQ) became the first aircraft to certify the Rolls-Royce FANS-1 package by remote type certification (RTC) in Sydney, Australia. It was followed by the first commercial flight from Sydney to Los Angeles on June 21. Subsequently, Air New Zealand certified the General Electric FANS-1 package, and United Airlines certified the Pratt & Whitney FANS-1 package.

On May 24, 2004, a Boeing Business Jet completed the first North Atlantic flight by a business jet equipped with FANS. The airplane touched down at the European Business Aviation Convention and Exhibition (EBACE) in Geneva, Switzerland. The non-stop eight-hour, 4,000-nautical-mile (7,400 km) flight originating from Gary/Chicago International Airport in Gary, Indiana, was part of a North Atlantic Traffic trial conducted by the FANS Central Monitoring Agency (FCMA).

In August 2010, Aegean Airlines became the first airline to commit to upgrading its Airbus A320 fleet with a FANS-B+ retrofit system offered by Airbus.

== See also ==
- Controller–pilot data link communications
- FANS-1/A
- Aircraft Communications Addressing and Reporting System (ACARS)
- Aeronautical Telecommunication Network (ATN)
- Automatic dependent surveillance – broadcast
