= Aeronautical Telecommunication Network =

Internetwork architecture

The Aeronautical Telecommunication Network (ATN) is an internetwork architecture that allows ground/ground, air/ground, and avionic data subnetworks to interoperate by adopting common interface services and protocols based on the ISO OSI Reference Model.

Aviation messages like OpMet data exchange is required to traverse the Aeronautical Telecommunications Network (ATN).

The European part of ATN used for ground/ground communications is represented by PENS.

== See also ==
- Aircraft Communications Addressing and Reporting System (ACARS)
- DO-219
- DO-232
- Future Air Navigation System (FANS)
