= ACARS =

Aircraft digital message communication system

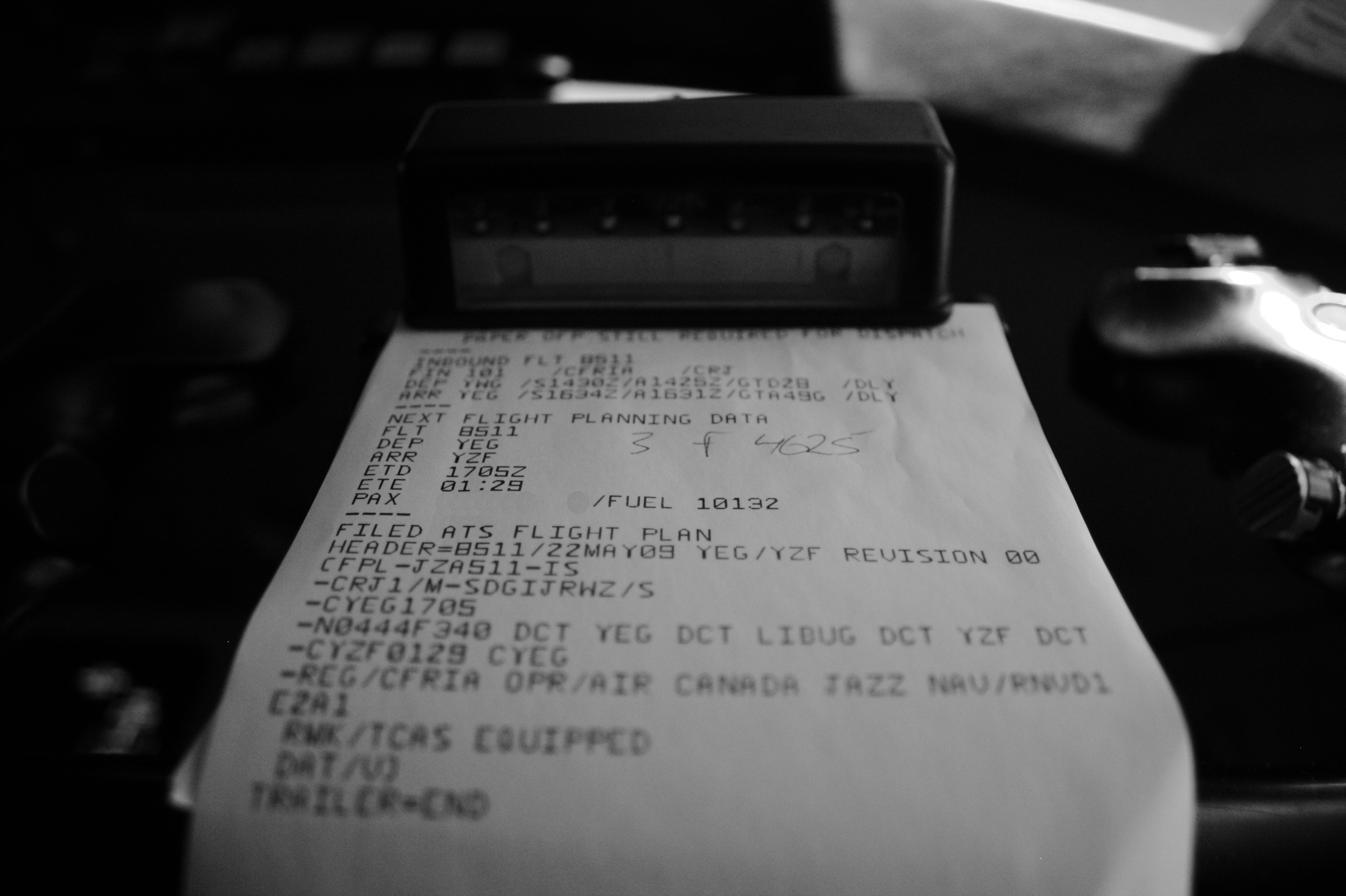
Example of an ACARS message

In aviation, ACARS (/ˈeɪkɑːrz/; an acronym for Aircraft Communications Addressing and Reporting System) is a digital data communication system for transmission of short messages between aircraft and ground stations via airband radio or satellite. The protocol was designed by ARINC and deployed in 1978, using the Telex format. More ACARS radio stations were added subsequently by SITA.

== History of ACARS ==
Prior to the introduction of datalink in aviation, all communication between the aircraft and ground personnel was performed by the flight crew using voice communication, using either VHF or HF voice radios. In many cases, the voice-relayed information involved dedicated radio operators and digital messages sent to an airline teletype system or successor systems.

Further, the hourly rates for flight and cabin crew salaries depended on whether the aircraft was airborne or not, and if on the ground whether it was at the gate or not. The flight crews reported these times by voice to geographically dispersed radio operators. Airlines wanted to eliminate self-reported times to preclude inaccuracies, whether accidental or deliberate. Doing so also reduced the need for human radio operators to receive the reports.

In an effort to reduce crew workload and improve data integrity, the engineering department at ARINC introduced the ACARS system in July 1978, as an automated time clock system. Teledyne Controls produced the avionics and the launch customer was Piedmont Airlines. The original expansion of the abbreviation was "Arinc Communications Addressing and Reporting System". Later, it was changed to "Aircraft Communications, Addressing and Reporting System". The original avionics standard was ARINC 597, which defined an ACARS Management Unit consisting of discrete inputs for the doors, parking brake and weight on wheels sensors to automatically determine the flight phase and generate and send as telex messages. It also contained a MSK modem, which was used to transmit the reports over existing VHF voice radios. Global standards for ACARS were prepared by the Airlines Electronic Engineering Committee (AEEC). The first day of ACARS operations saw about 4,000 transactions, but it did not experience widespread use by the major airlines until the 1980s.

Early ACARS systems were extended over the years to support aircraft with digital data bus interfaces, flight management systems, and thermal printers.

== System description and functions ==
ACARS as a term refers to the complete air and ground system, consisting of equipment on board, equipment on the ground, and a service provider.

On-board ACARS equipment consists of end systems with a router, which routes messages through the air-ground subnetwork.

Ground equipment is made up of a network of radio transceivers managed by a central site computer called AFEPS (Arinc Front End Processor System), which handles and routes messages. Generally, ground ACARS units are either government agencies such as the Federal Aviation Administration, an airline operations headquarters, or, for small airlines or general aviation, a third-party subscription service. Usually government agencies are responsible for clearances, while airline operations handle gate assignments, maintenance, and passenger needs.

=== The ground processing system ===
Ground system provision is the responsibility of either a participating air navigation service provider (ANSP) or an aircraft operator. Aircraft operators often contract out the function to either datalink service provider (DSP) or to a separate service provider. Messages from aircraft, especially automatically generated ones, can be pre-configured according to message type so that they are automatically delivered to the appropriate recipient just as ground-originated messages can be configured to reach the correct aircraft.

The ACARS equipment on the aircraft is linked to that on the ground by the DSP. Because the ACARS network is modeled after the point-to-point telex network, all messages come to a central processing location to be routed. ARINC and SITA are the two primary service providers, with smaller operations from others in some areas. Some areas have multiple service providers.

== ACARS message types ==
ACARS messages may be of three broad types:

- Air traffic control messages are used to request or provide clearances.
- Aeronautical operational control
- Airline administrative control

Control messages are used to communicate between the aircraft and its base, with messages either standardized according to ARINC Standard 633, or user-defined in accordance with ARINC Standard 618. The contents of such messages can be OOOI events, flight plans, weather information, equipment health, status of connecting flights, etc.

=== OOOI events ===
A major function of ACARS is to automatically detect and report the start of each major flight phase, called OOOI events in the industry (out of the gate, off the ground, on the ground, and into the gate). These OOOI events are detected using input from aircraft sensors mounted on doors, parking brakes, and struts. At the start of each flight phase, an ACARS message is transmitted to the ground describing the flight phase, the time at which it occurred, and other related information such as the amount of fuel on board or the flight origin and destination. These messages are used to track the status of aircraft and crews.

=== Flight management system interface ===
ACARS interfaces with flight management systems (FMS), acting as the communication system for flight plans and weather information to be sent from the ground to the FMS. This enables the airline to update the FMS while in flight, and allows the flight crew to evaluate new weather conditions or alternative flight plans.

=== Equipment health and maintenance data ===
ACARS is used to send information from the aircraft to ground stations about the conditions of various aircraft systems and sensors in real-time. Maintenance faults and abnormal events are also transmitted to ground stations along with detailed messages, which are used by the airline for monitoring equipment health, and to better plan repair and maintenance activities.

=== Ping messages ===
Automated ping messages are used to test an aircraft's connection with the communication station. In the event that the aircraft ACARS unit has been silent for longer than a preset time interval, the ground station can ping the aircraft (directly or via satellite). A ping response indicates a healthy ACARS communication.

=== Manually sent messages ===
ACARS interfaces with interactive display units in the cockpit, which flight crews can use to send and receive technical messages and reports to or from ground stations, such as a request for weather information or clearances or the status of connecting flights. The response from the ground station is received on the aircraft via ACARS as well. Each airline customizes ACARS to this role to suit its needs.

== Communication details ==
ACARS messages may be sent using a choice of communication methods, such as VHF or HF, either direct to ground or via satellite (e.g. Inmarsat), using minimum-shift keying (MSK) modulation.

ACARS can send messages over VHF, if a VHF ground station network exists in the current area of the aircraft. VHF communication is line-of-sight propagation and the typical range is up to 200 nautical miles (370 km) at high altitudes. Where VHF is absent, an HF network or satellite communication may be used if available. Satellite coverage may be limited at high latitudes (trans-polar flights).

Sample ACARS VHF transmission
The sound of an ACARS VHF transmission made on 130.025 MHz, recorded at Petaluma, California on 15 August 2006. The short "beep" at the beginning of the message is the "alert" preamble in the protocol. The remainder of the clip -- which sounds like radio static -- is the actual data stream of the message.

A typical ACARS VHF transmission.
Mode	A
Aircraft	B-18722
Ack	NAK
Block id	2
Flight	CI5118
Label	B9
Msg No.	L05A
Message	/KLAX.TI2/024KLAXA91A1

== Role of ACARS in air accidents and incidents ==
In the wake of the crash of Air France Flight 447 in 2009, there was discussion about making ACARS an "online-black-box" to reduce the effects of the loss of a flight recorder. However no changes were made to the ACARS system.

In March 2014, ACARS messages and Doppler analysis of ACARS satellite communication data played a very significant role in efforts to trace Malaysia Airlines Flight 370 to an approximate location. While the primary ACARS system on board MH370 had been switched off, a second ACARS system called Classic Aero was active as long as the plane was powered up, and kept trying to establish a connection to an Inmarsat satellite every hour.

The ACARS unit on the Airbus A320 of EgyptAir Flight 804 sent ACARS messages indicating the presence of smoke in toilets and the avionics bay prior to the aircraft's crash into the Mediterranean Sea on May 19, 2016, which killed all 66 persons on board.

On 24 February 2021, the ACARS unit of a South African Airways flight from Johannesburg's OR Tambo International Airport to Brussels sent an ACARS message about an “alpha floor event”, which was activated when the Airbus A340-600's envelope protection system activated to override the pilots to prevent the plane from stalling on take-off.

On 19 February 2023, there were numerous ACARS reports of a large white balloon near Hawaii in the aircraft lanes.

== Uses of ACARS outside aviation ==
In 2002, ACARS was added to the NOAA Observing System Architecture. Thus commercial aircraft can act as weather data providers for weather agencies to use in their forecast models, sending meteorological observations like winds and temperatures over the ACARS network. NOAA provides real-time weather maps.

== See also ==
- VHF Data Link
- High Frequency Data Link (HFDL)
- Acronyms and abbreviations in avionics
- Aeronautical Telecommunication Network (ATN)
- Future Air Navigation System (FANS)
- SELCAL
