= STANAG 4626 =

Set of avionics standards

STANAG 4626 is a NATO Standardization Agreement which defines a set of Open Architecture Standards for Avionics Architecture, particularly in the field of Integrated Modular Avionics. The purpose of this standard is to establish uniform requirements for the architecture for Integrated Modular Avionics (IMA) systems as defined by the ASAAC program. A reference implementation is on SourceForge under an Apache license.

== History ==
This STANAG was proposed by the UK Ministry of Defence, and originated from the ASAAC effort. As for ASAAC, many major European Avionics companies participate in its definition, such as:

- BAE Systems
- GE Aviation Systems (formerly Smiths Aerospace)
- Dassault Aviation
- Thales Group
- Airbus (formerly EADS)
- ESG Elektroniksystem- und Logistik-GmbH
- GMV Innovating Solutions

== See also ==
- ASAAC
- Integrated Modular Avionics
- ARINC 653
