= European Component Oriented Architecture =

European Component Oriented Architecture (ECOA) is an open specification for a software framework for mission system software comprising components that are both real-time and service-oriented.

ECOA is managed by the French Direction générale de l'armement and the UK Ministry of Defence (through the Defence Science and Technology Laboratory - DSTL) with the help of the following industry partners:

- BAE Systems (Electronic Systems and Military Air & Information)
- Groupe Bull
- General Dynamics (UK branch)
- GE Aviation Systems
- Leonardo S.p.A.
- Dassault Aviation
- Thales Group (Air forces branch)

== History ==
The initial study began in January 2008 with French partners, but work on the standard really began in January 2011. In August 2015, the first version of the standard was published as a UK Defense standard (DEFSTAN). In December 2015, the standard was republished as a BNAE standard. In July 2016, an updated specification has been made available.

== Concepts ==
ECOA defines an architecture framework based on a Service-oriented architecture. ECOA Software Components (ASCs) are composed of modules which contain the application code and may run in parallel. ECOA provides mechanisms to make these software components portable across computing platforms through use of an interfacing layer called a container. Components communicate with other components using events, request–response and versioned data.

== See also ==
- Service-oriented architecture
- Allied Standards Avionics Architecture Council
- Integrated modular avionics
