= Avionics =

Electronic systems used on aircraft

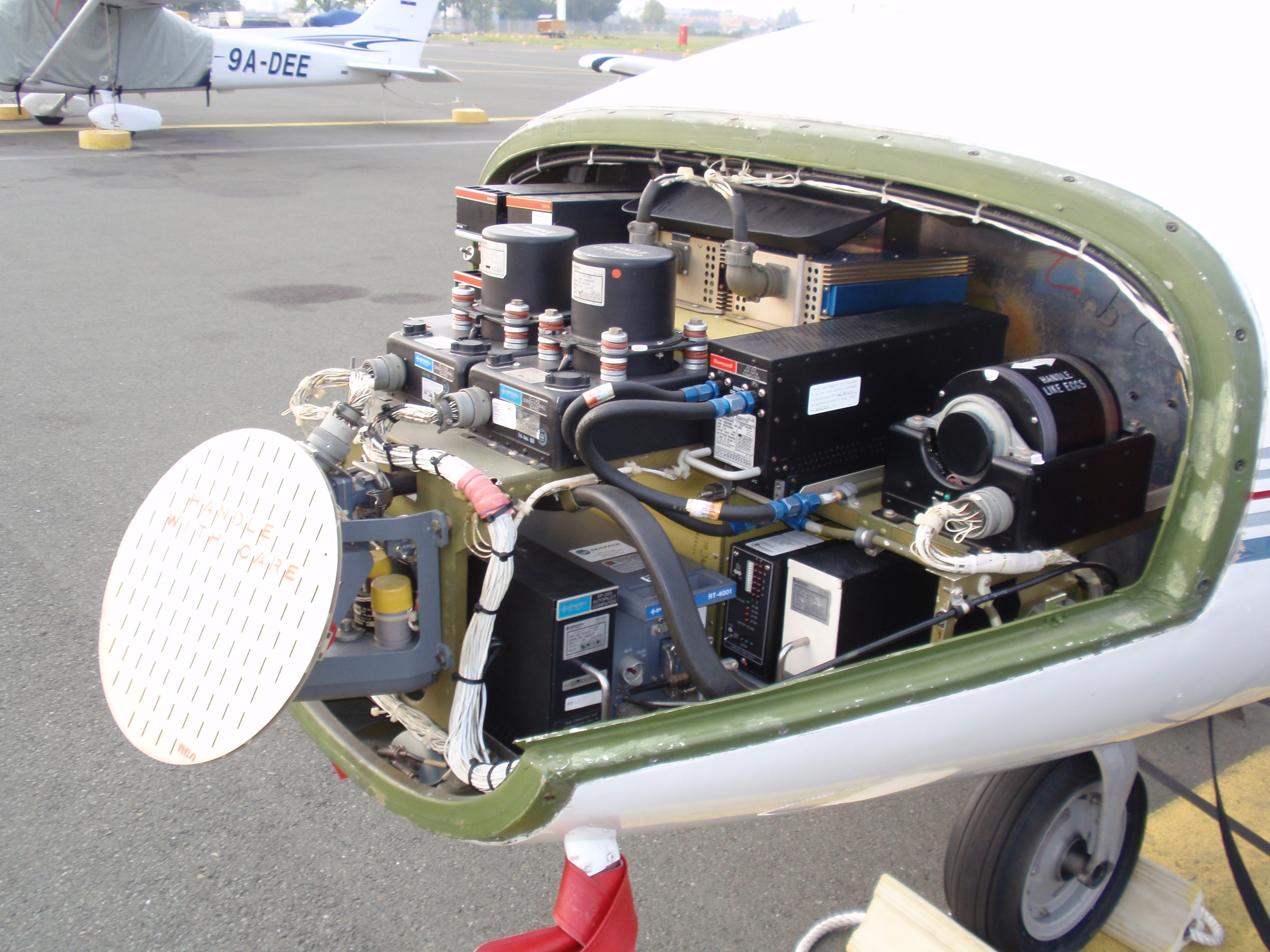
Radar and other avionics in the nose of a Cessna Citation I/SP

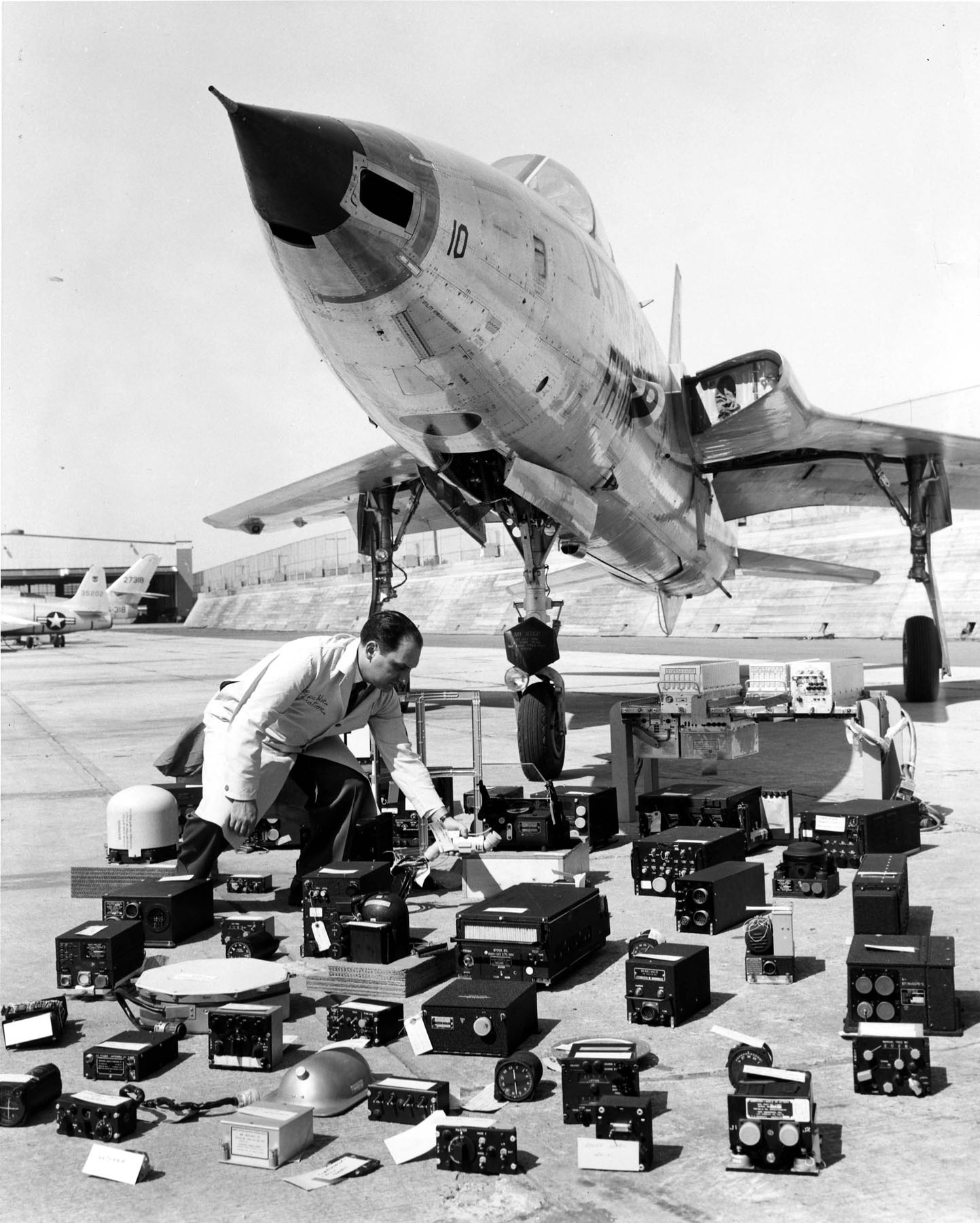
F-105 Thunderchief with avionics laid out

Avionics (a portmanteau of aviation and electronics) are the electronic systems used on aircraft. Avionic systems include communications, navigation, the display and management of multiple systems, and the hundreds of systems that are fitted to aircraft to perform individual functions. These can be as simple as a searchlight for a police helicopter or as complicated as the tactical system for an airborne early warning platform.

== History ==
The term "avionics" was coined in 1949 by Philip J. Klass, senior editor at Aviation Week & Space Technology magazine as a portmanteau of "aviation electronics".

Radio communication was first used in aircraft just prior to World War I. The first airborne radios were in zeppelins, but the military sparked development of light radio sets that could be carried by heavier-than-air craft, so that aerial reconnaissance biplanes could report their observations immediately in case they were shot down. The first experimental radio transmission from an airplane was conducted by the U.S. Navy in August 1910. The first aircraft radios transmitted by radiotelegraphy. They required a two-seat aircraft with a second crewman who operated a telegraph key to spell out messages in Morse code. During World War I, amplitude modulation voice two way radio sets were made possible in 1917 (see TM (triode)) by the development of the triode vacuum tube, which were simple enough that the pilot in a single seat aircraft could use it while flying.

Radar, the central technology used today in aircraft navigation and air traffic control, was developed by several nations, mainly in secret, as an air defense system in the 1930s during the runup to World War II. Many modern avionics have their origins in World War II wartime developments. For example, autopilot systems that are commonplace today began as specialized systems to help bomber planes fly steadily enough to hit precision targets from high altitudes. Britain's 1940 decision to share its radar technology with its U.S. ally, particularly the magnetron vacuum tube, in the famous Tizard Mission, significantly shortened the war. Modern avionics is a substantial portion of military aircraft spending. Aircraft like the F-15E and the now retired F-14 have roughly 20 percent of their budget spent on avionics. Most modern helicopters now have budget splits of 60/40 in favour of avionics.

The civilian market has also seen a growth in cost of avionics. Flight control systems (fly-by-wire) and new navigation needs brought on by tighter airspaces, have pushed up development costs. The major change has been the recent boom in consumer flying. As more people begin to use planes as their primary method of transportation, more elaborate methods of controlling aircraft safely in these high restrictive airspaces have been invented.

=== Modern avionics ===
Avionics plays a heavy role in modernization initiatives like the Federal Aviation Administration's (FAA) Next Generation Air Transportation System project in the United States and the Single European Sky ATM Research (SESAR) initiative in Europe. The Joint Planning and Development Office put forth a roadmap for avionics in six areas:

- Published Routes and Procedures – Improved navigation and routing
- Negotiated Trajectories – Adding data communications to create preferred routes dynamically
- Delegated Separation – Enhanced situational awareness in the air and on the ground
- LowVisibility/CeilingApproach/Departure – Allowing operations with weather constraints with less ground infrastructure
- Surface Operations – To increase safety in approach and departure
- ATM Efficiencies – Improving the air traffic management (ATM) process

=== Market ===
The Aircraft Electronics Association reports $1.73 billion avionics sales for the first three quarters of 2017 in business and general aviation, a 4.1% yearly improvement: 73.5% came from North America, forward-fit represented 42.3% while 57.7% were retrofits as the U.S. deadline of January 1, 2020 for mandatory ADS-B out approach.

== Aircraft avionics ==
The cockpit or, in larger aircraft, under the cockpit of an aircraft or in a movable nosecone, is a typical location for avionic bay equipment, including control, monitoring, communication, navigation, weather, and anti-collision systems. The majority of aircraft power their avionics using 14- or 28‑volt DC electrical systems; however, larger, more sophisticated aircraft (such as airliners or military combat aircraft) have AC systems operating at 115 volts 400 Hz, AC. There are several major vendors of flight avionics, including The Boeing Company, Panasonic Avionics Corporation, Honeywell (which now owns Bendix/King), Universal Avionics Systems Corporation, Rockwell Collins (now Collins Aerospace), Thales Group, GE Aviation Systems, Garmin, Raytheon, Parker Hannifin, UTC Aerospace Systems (now Collins Aerospace), Selex ES (now Leonardo), Shadin Avionics, Avidyne Corporation and Israel Aerospace Industries.

International standards for avionics equipment are prepared by the Airlines Electronic Engineering Committee and published by ARINC.

=== Communications ===
Communications connect the flight deck to the ground and the flight deck to the passengers. On‑board communications are provided by public-address systems and aircraft intercoms.

The VHF aviation communication system works on the airband of 118.000 MHz to 136.975 MHz. Each channel is spaced from the adjacent ones by 8.33 kHz in Europe, 25 kHz elsewhere. VHF is also used for line of sight communication such as aircraft-to-aircraft and aircraft-to-ATC. Amplitude modulation is used, and the conversation is performed in simplex mode. Aircraft communication can also take place using HF (especially for trans-oceanic flights) or satellite communication.

=== Navigation ===
Air navigation is the determination of position and direction on or above the surface of the Earth. Avionics can use satellite navigation systems (such as GPS, WAAS, EGNOS and GBAS/LAAS), inertial navigation system (INS), ground-based radio navigation systems (such as VOR or LORAN), or any combination thereof. Some navigation systems such as GPS calculate the position automatically and display it to the flight crew on moving map displays. Older ground-based Navigation systems such as VOR or LORAN requires a pilot or navigator to plot the intersection of signals on a paper map to determine an aircraft's location; modern systems calculate the position automatically and display it to the flight crew on moving map displays.

=== Monitoring ===
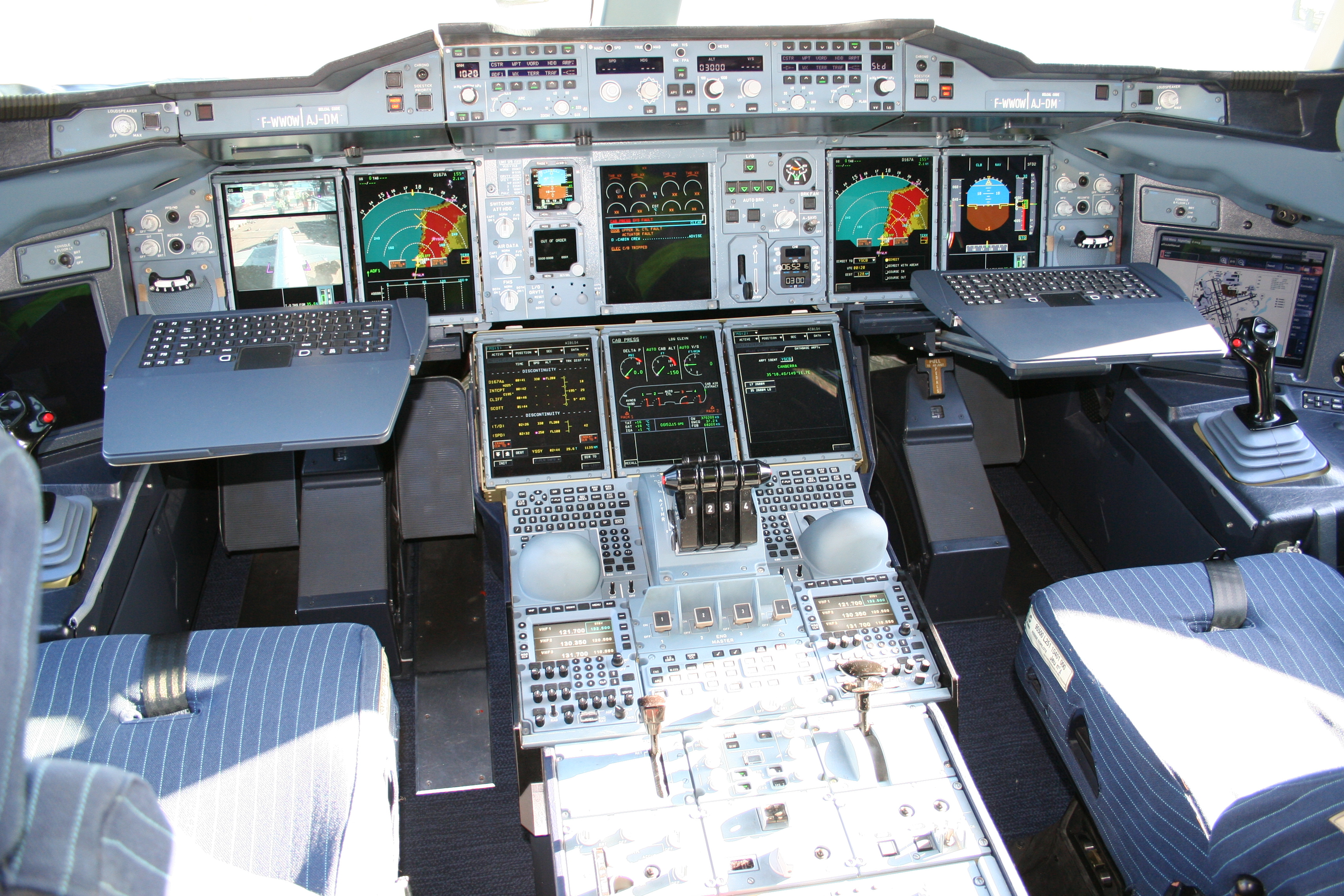
The Airbus A380 glass cockpit featuring pull-out keyboards and two wide computer screens on the sides for pilots

The first hints of glass cockpits emerged in the 1970s when flight-worthy cathode ray tube (CRT) screens began to replace electromechanical displays, gauges and instruments. A "glass" cockpit refers to the use of computer monitors instead of gauges and other analog displays. Aircraft were getting progressively more displays, dials and information dashboards that eventually competed for space and pilot attention. In the 1970s, the average aircraft had more than 100 cockpit instruments and controls. Glass cockpits started to come into being with the Gulfstream G‑IV private jet in 1985. One of the key challenges in glass cockpits is to balance how much control is automated and how much the pilot should do manually. Generally they try to automate flight operations while keeping the pilot constantly informed.

=== Aircraft flight-control system ===
Aircraft have means of automatically controlling flight. Autopilot was first invented by Lawrence Sperry during World War I to fly bomber planes steady enough to hit accurate targets from 25,000 feet. When it was first adopted by the U.S. military, a Honeywell engineer sat in the back seat with bolt cutters to disconnect the autopilot in case of emergency. Nowadays most commercial planes are equipped with aircraft flight control systems in order to reduce pilot error and workload at landing or takeoff.

The first simple commercial auto-pilots were used to control heading and altitude and had limited authority on things like thrust and flight control surfaces. In helicopters, auto-stabilization was used in a similar way. The first systems were electromechanical. The advent of fly-by-wire and electro-actuated flight surfaces (rather than the traditional hydraulic) has increased safety. As with displays and instruments, critical devices that were electro-mechanical had a finite life. With safety critical systems, the software is very strictly tested.

=== Fuel Systems ===
Fuel Quantity Indication System (FQIS) monitors the amount of fuel aboard. Using various sensors, such as capacitance tubes, temperature sensors, densitometers & level sensors, the FQIS computer calculates the mass of fuel remaining on board.

Fuel Control and Monitoring System (FCMS) reports fuel remaining on board in a similar manner, but, by controlling pumps & valves, also manages fuel transfers around various tanks.

- Refuelling control to upload to a certain total mass of fuel and distribute it automatically.
- Transfers during flight to the tanks that feed the engines. E.G. from fuselage to wing tanks
- Centre of gravity control transfers from the tail (trim) tanks forward to the wings as fuel is expended
- Maintaining fuel in the wing tips (to alleviate wing bending due to lift in flight) & transferring to the main tanks after landing
- Controlling fuel jettison during an emergency to reduce the aircraft weight.

=== Collision-avoidance systems ===
To supplement air traffic control, most large transport aircraft and many smaller ones use a traffic alert and collision avoidance system (TCAS), which can detect the location of nearby aircraft, and provide instructions for avoiding a midair collision. Smaller aircraft may use simpler traffic alerting systems such as TPAS, which are passive (they do not actively interrogate the transponders of other aircraft) and do not provide advisories for conflict resolution.

To help avoid controlled flight into terrain (CFIT), aircraft use systems such as ground-proximity warning systems (GPWS), which use radar altimeters as a key element. One of the major weaknesses of GPWS is the lack of "look-ahead" information, because it only provides altitude above terrain "look-down". In order to overcome this weakness, modern aircraft use a terrain awareness warning system (TAWS).

=== Flight recorders ===
Commercial aircraft cockpit data recorders, commonly known as "black boxes", store flight information and audio from the cockpit. They are often recovered from an aircraft after a crash to determine control settings and other parameters during the incident.

=== Weather systems ===
Weather systems such as weather radar (typically Arinc 708 on commercial aircraft) and lightning detectors are important for aircraft flying at night or in instrument meteorological conditions, where it is not possible for pilots to see the weather ahead. Heavy precipitation (as sensed by radar) or severe turbulence (as sensed by lightning activity) are both indications of strong convective activity and severe turbulence, and weather systems allow pilots to deviate around these areas.

Lightning detectors like the Stormscope or Strikefinder have become inexpensive enough that they are practical for light aircraft. In addition to radar and lightning detection, observations and extended radar pictures (such as NEXRAD) are now available through satellite data connections, allowing pilots to see weather conditions far beyond the range of their own in-flight systems. Modern displays allow weather information to be integrated with moving maps, terrain, and traffic onto a single screen, greatly simplifying navigation.

Modern weather systems also include wind shear and turbulence detection and terrain and traffic warning systems. In‑plane weather avionics are especially popular in Africa, India, and other countries where air-travel is a growing market, but ground support is not as well developed.

=== Aircraft management systems ===
There has been a progression towards centralized control of the multiple complex systems fitted to aircraft, including engine monitoring and management. Health and usage monitoring systems (HUMS) are integrated with aircraft management computers to give maintainers early warnings of parts that will need replacement.

The integrated modular avionics concept proposes an integrated architecture with application software portable across an assembly of common hardware modules. It has been used in fourth generation jet fighters and the latest generation of airliners.

== Mission or tactical avionics ==
Military aircraft have been designed either to deliver a weapon or to be the eyes and ears of other weapon systems. The vast array of sensors available to the military is used for whatever tactical means required. As with aircraft management, the bigger sensor platforms (like the E‑3D, JSTARS, ASTOR, Nimrod MRA4, Merlin HM Mk 1) have mission-management computers.

Police and EMS aircraft also carry sophisticated tactical sensors.

=== Military communications ===
While aircraft communications provide the backbone for safe flight, the tactical systems are designed to withstand the rigors of the battlefield. UHF, VHF Tactical (30–88 MHz) and SatCom systems combined with ECCM methods, and cryptography secure the communications. Data links such as Link 11, 16, 22 and BOWMAN, JTRS and even TETRA provide the means of transmitting data (such as images, targeting information etc.).

=== Radar ===
Airborne radar was one of the first tactical sensors. The benefit of altitude providing range has meant a significant focus on airborne radar technologies. Radars include airborne early warning, anti-submarine warfare, and even weather radar (Arinc 708) and ground tracking/proximity radar.

The military uses radar in fast jets to help pilots fly at low levels. While the civil market has had weather radar for a while, there are strict rules about using it to navigate the aircraft.

=== Sonar ===
Dipping sonar fitted to a range of military helicopters allows the helicopter to protect shipping assets from submarines or surface threats. Maritime support aircraft can drop active and passive sonar devices (sonobuoys) and these are also used to determine the location of enemy submarines.

=== Electro-optics ===
Electro-optic systems include devices such as the head-up display (HUD), forward looking infrared (FLIR), infrared search and track and other passive infrared devices (Passive infrared sensor). These are all used to provide imagery and information to the flight crew. This imagery is used for everything from search and rescue to navigational aids and target acquisition.

=== ESM/DAS ===
Electronic support measures and defensive aids systems are used extensively to gather information about threats or possible threats. They can be used to launch devices (in some cases automatically) to counter direct threats against the aircraft. They are also used to determine the state of a threat and identify it.

=== Aircraft networks ===
The avionics systems in military, commercial and advanced models of civilian aircraft are interconnected using an avionics databus. Common avionics databus protocols, with their primary application, include:

- Aircraft Data Network (ADN): Ethernet derivative for Commercial Aircraft
- Avionics Full-Duplex Switched Ethernet: Specific implementation of ARINC 664 (ADN) for Commercial Aircraft
- ARINC 429: Generic Medium-Speed Data Sharing for Private and Commercial Aircraft
- ARINC 664: See ADN above
- ARINC 629: Commercial Aircraft (Boeing 777)
- ARINC 708: Weather Radar for Commercial Aircraft
- ARINC 717: Flight Data Recorder for Commercial Aircraft
- ARINC 825: CAN bus for commercial aircraft (for example Boeing 787 and Airbus A350)
- Commercial Standard Digital Bus
- IEEE 1394b: Military Aircraft
- MIL-STD-1553: Military Aircraft
- MIL-STD-1760: Military Aircraft
- TTP – Time-Triggered Protocol: Boeing 787, Airbus A380, Fly-By-Wire Actuation Platforms from Parker Aerospace

== See also ==
- Astrionics, similar, for spacecraft
- ACARS – Aircraft digital message communication system
- Acronyms and abbreviations in avionics
- ARINC – American company (1929–2018)
- Avionics software
- DO-178C – International aeronautics software standard
- Emergency locator beacon
- Emergency position-indicating radiobeacon
- Flight recorder – Robust aircraft electronic recording device
- Integrated modular avionics
