= 828 (disambiguation) =

828 may refer to

- 828 (number), the natural number following 827 and preceding 829
- AD 828, a leap year
- 828 BC, a year
- 828 area code, a telephone area code in the North American Numbering Plan for most of the western third of the U.S. state of North Carolina
- 828 Lindemannia, a minor planet
- 828 film, a film format for still photography
- 828 Naval Air Squadron, a Royal Navy Fleet Air Arm carrier based squadron formed in September 1940 as a torpedo spotter reconnaissance squadron
- ARINC 828, an electronic flight bag interface standard for aircraft
- Flight 828, the major subject of Manifest (TV series)
- Dacon 828, a microcar
  - Obvio! 828, a microcar based on the Dacon 828

== See also ==
- List of highways numbered 828
