= Mission Control (disambiguation) =

A mission control center is an entity that manages aerospace vehicle flights.

Mission Control may also refer to:

- Christopher C. Kraft Jr. Mission Control Center, a NASA control center in Houston, Texas
- Mission control centre (Cospas-Sarsat), clearinghouse responsible for receiving and distributing distress signals from radiobeacons
- Mission Control (album) an album by rock band The Whigs
- Mission: Control!, a 1999 album from rock band Burning Airlines
- Mission Control (video game), a 2001 educational platform game
- Mission Control, a grappling position also known as the rubber guard
- Mission Control (macOS), a feature of macOS
- Mission Control Space Services, a Canadian space technology company located in Ottawa, ON
- JDK Mission Control, an open source production time profiling and diagnostics tools suite for Java
- "Mission Control" a song by Kanye West from the physical release and deluxe of his album, Bully

== See also ==
- Flight control (disambiguation)
