= Obvio! =

Brazilian automobile manufacturer

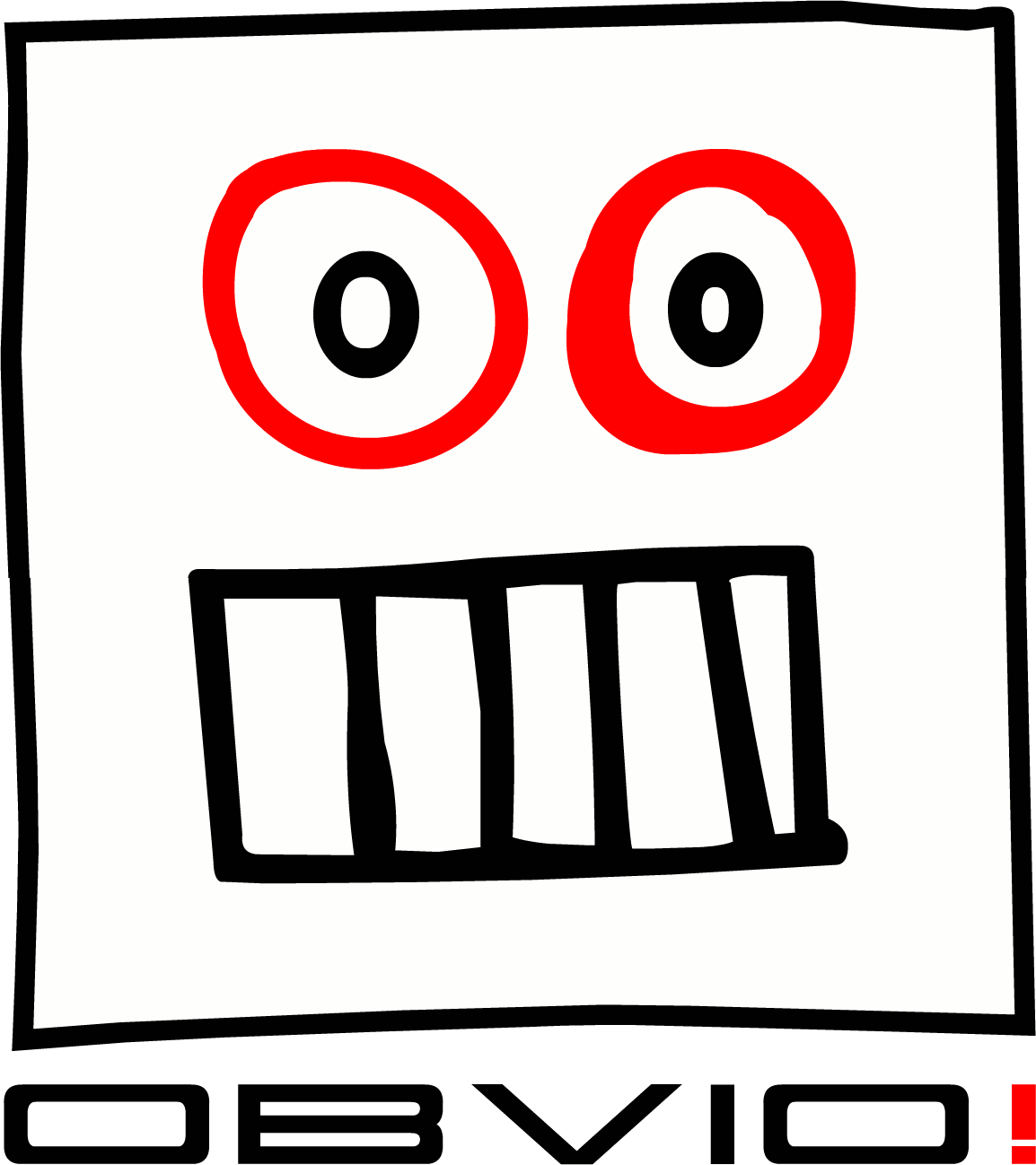
- Industry: Automobile manufacturer
- Headquarters: Brazil
- Products: Obvio! 012; Obvio! 828; Obvio! 828H; Obvio! 813; Obvio! 830
- Website: www.obvio.rio

Obvio! is a Brazilian automobile manufacturer that specializes in the production of microcars. Plans were made to sell their cars in the United States through the ZAP distribution network. The company was wound down for a while with the death of vehicle designer Anísio Campos in 2019.

== Details ==
Obvio! vehicles are described as "high performance urban cars". The Obvio! 828 and the Obvio! 012 are mid-engined models powered by a 1.6 L 16-valve inline 4-cylinder Tritec engine producing 115 hp (86 kW). Versions producing 170 hp (130 kW) or 250 hp (190 kW) are also available. Fuel consumption is 12.5 km/L (35 mpg_{‑imp}; 29 mpg_{‑US}) in the city or 17.3 km/L (49 mpg_{‑imp}; 41 mpg_{‑US}) in highway. These are flexible-fuel vehicles that run on either gasoline, pure ethanol (E100), or any mix thereof. The cars are fitted with a continuously variable transmission (CVT) that can mimic a 6-speed sequential gearbox.

The chassis is designed as a series of ellipses (a system called "Niess Elliptical Survival Rings") to be strong yet light. The cars have one bench seat that seats three, and are fitted with airbags. It has McPherson suspension and disc brakes all around. The internal and external panels of the bodyshell are made in ABS/PMMA plastic. It uses scissor doors and also has a Boblbee backpack space integrated into the design.

The 828 has a list price of US$14,000 and the 012 has a list price of US$28,000. Extras offered are air conditioning (hot/cold), individual seats, power windows/rear mirror/central locking, leather seats and an iMobile Carputer.

The Obvio! 828H is hybrid electric concept car that runs on a flex-fuel engines and was presented in Rio de Janeiro in November 2010.
