= JFR =

JFR can mean:

- J. Front Retailing, a Japanese company
- JDK Flight Recorder, Java diagnostic software
- Johann's Face Records, Chicago, US
- John Faulkner Racing, a former motor racing team in Australia
- Paamiut Airport (IATA airport code), in Paamiut, Greenland
- Journal of Formalized Reasoning in mathematics
