= Biphase =

Biphase or Bi-phase may refer to:

- Biphase modulation, or binary phase-shift keying
- Differential Manchester encoding, also known as Aiken biphase or biphase mark code
- Harvard biphase, used to encode data onto magnetic tape
- Mu-Tron Bi-Phase, a musical effects device

== See also ==
- Biphasic (disambiguation)
