= ARINC =

American company (1929–2018)

- Industry: Airports, aviation, defense, government, healthcare, networks, security, and transportation
- Founded: 1929 as Aeronautical Radio, Incorporated
- Fate: Acquired
- Headquarters: Cedar Rapids, Iowa, United States; formerly Annapolis, Maryland, United States
- Revenue: ▲$919 million USD (2006).
- Owner: Collins Aerospace
- Number of employees: 3,200
- Website: rockwellcollins.com

Aeronautical Radio, Incorporated (ARINC), established in 1929, was a major provider of transport communications and systems engineering solutions for eight industries: aviation, airports, defense, government, healthcare, networks, security, and transportation. ARINC had installed computer data networks in police cars and railroad cars and also maintained the standards for line-replaceable units.

ARINC was formerly headquartered in Annapolis, Maryland, and had two regional headquarters in London, established in 1999 to serve the Europe, Middle East, and Africa region, and Singapore, established in 2003 for the Asia-Pacific region. ARINC had more than 3,200 employees at over 120 locations worldwide.

The sale of the company by the Carlyle Group to Rockwell Collins was completed on December 23, 2013, and from November 2018 onward operates as part of Collins Aerospace.

== History ==
ARINC was incorporated in 1929 as Aeronautical Radio, Incorporated. It was chartered by the Federal Radio Commission (which later became the Federal Communications Commission) in order to serve as the airline industry's single licensee and coordinator of radio communication outside of the government. The corporation's stock was held by four major airlines of the day. Through most of its history, ARINC was owned by airlines and other aviation-related companies such as Boeing until the sale to The Carlyle Group in October 2007.

Not much later ARINC took on the responsibility for all ground-based, aeronautical radio stations and for ensuring station compliance with Federal Radio Commission (FRC) rules and regulations. Using this as a base technology, ARINC expanded its contributions to transport communications as well as continuing to support the commercial aviation industry and U.S. military.

ARINC also developed the standards for the trays and boxes used to hold standard line-replaceable units (like radios) in aircraft. This subsequently allowed electronics to be rapidly replaced without complex fasteners or test equipment.

In 1978 ARINC introduced ACARS (Aircraft Communications Addressing and Reporting System), a datalink system that enables ground stations (airports, aircraft maintenance bases, etc.) to upload data (such as flight plans) and download data (such as fuel quantity, weight on wheels, flight management system (FMS) data), via an onboard Communications Management Unit (CMU).

ARINC has expanded its business in aerospace and defense through its ARINC Engineering Services subsidiary. With the sale of the company to Rockwell Collins, the ARINC Engineering Services subsidiary split into Commercial Aerospace and Defense Services. The Defense Services branch was then purchased by Booz Allen Hamilton, remaining part of the Carlyle group.

The sale of a Standards Development Organization (SDP) to a corporate sponsor raised concerns of conflict of interest and resulted in the sale of the ARINC Industry Activities (IA) Division to SAE International in January 2014. It now operates under the SAE Industry Technologies Consortia (SAE ITC).

United Technologies completed its acquisition of Rockwell Collins in November 2018 and merged it with its UTC Aerospace Systems to form Collins Aerospace.

== Activities and services ==
Though known for publishing "ARINC Standards", this role is independent of ARINC commercial activities.

=== Standardization and ARINC Industry Activities ===
ARINC Industry Activities involve three aviation committees:

- AEEC (Airlines Electronic Engineering Committee): Develop the ARINC Standards,
- AMC (Avionics Maintenance Conference): Organize the annual Avionics Maintenance Conference,
- FSEMC (Flight Simulator Engineering & Maintenance Conference): Organize the annual FSEMC conference.

=== ARINC services ===
ARINC services include:

- ACARS – a digital datalink system for transmission of short, relatively simple messages between aircraft and ground stations via radio or satellite
- AviNet Global Data Network - formerly known as the ARINC Data Network Service (ADNS)
- Air/Ground Domestic Voice Service
- Air/Ground International Voice Service
- Airport Remote Radio Access System (ARRAS)
- vMUSE – Multi-User Systems Environment for shared passenger check-in at airports
  - Complies with the Common-Use Terminal Equipment (CUTE) and Common Use Passenger Processing System (CUPPS) standards
- SelfServ – common use self-service passenger check-in kiosks for Airports
- OnVoy – Internet-based passenger check-in system for use at off-airport locations such as hotels, cruise ships and convention centers
- AirVue – Flight Information Display System (FIDS) for airports
  - Also called Electronic Visual Information Display System (EVIDS)
- AirDB – Airport Operational Database Base (AODB)
- AirPlan by ARINC - Resource Management System (RMS)
- VeriPax – Passenger Reconciliation System (PRS) validates passengers at security checkpoints
- Centralized Flight Management Computer Waypoint Reporting System (CFRS)
- Satellite Navigation and Air Traffic Control and Landing Systems (SATNAV and ATCALS)
- ARINC Wireless Interoperable Network Solutions (AWINS) – connects all types of radio and telephone systems including standard UHF and VHF analog radios, mobile digital, voice over IP systems, ship-to-shore, air-ground, standard phones, and push-to-talk cellular.
- ARINC Border Management Solutions (ABMS) – delivering a full stay management capability, screening all travellers before travel, and managing visitors throughout their stay.
- In Flight Broadband – offering in-flight connectivity to passengers and crew in conjunction with SwiftBroadband.
- AviSec – passenger data transfer and Advance Passenger Information System.
- Advanced Information Management (AIM) User Interface
- Cybersecurity for Critical Infrastructure

== Standards ==
The ARINC Standards are prepared by the Airlines Electronic Engineering Committee (AEEC) where aviation suppliers such as Collins Aerospace, GE Aerospace, and Universal Avionics serve as contributors in support of their airline customer base. An abbreviated list follows.

=== 400 Series ===
The 400 Series describes guidelines for installation, wiring, data buses, and databases.

- ARINC 404 defines Air Transport Rack (ATR) form factors for avionics equipment installed in many types of aircraft. It defines air transport equipment cases and racking.
- ARINC 407 is a manual for Synchro uses in aerospace systems
- ARINC 424 is an international standard file format for aircraft navigation data.
- ARINC 429 is the most widely used data bus standard for aviation. Electrical and data format characteristics are defined for a two-wire serial bus with one transmitter and up to 20 receivers. The bus is capable of operating at a speed of 100 kbit/s.

=== 500 Series ===
The 500 Series describes older analog avionics equipment used on early jet aircraft such as the Boeing 727, Douglas DC-9, DC-10, Boeing 737 and 747, and Airbus A300.

=== 600 Series ===
The 600 Series are reference standards for avionics equipment specified by the ARINC 700 Series

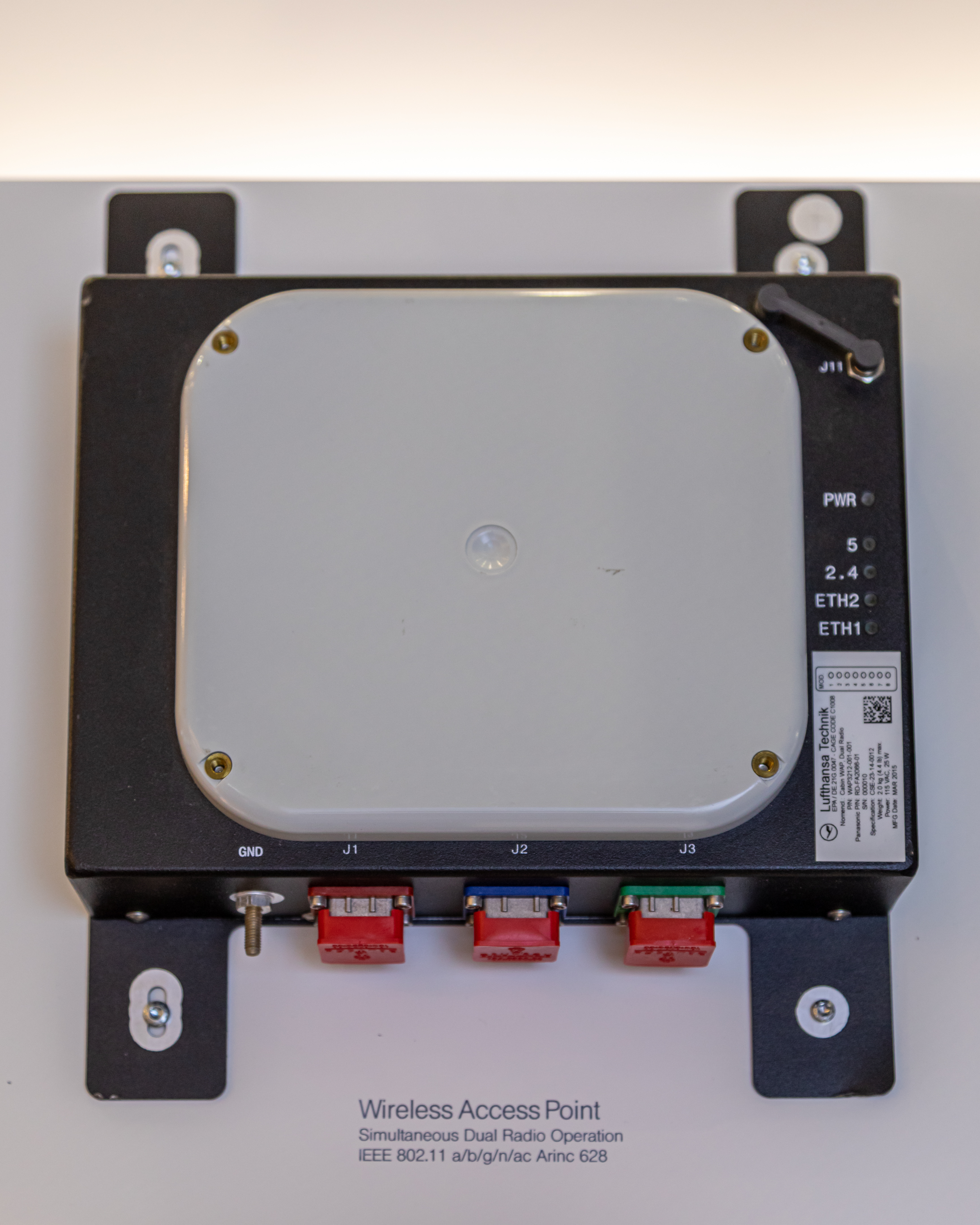
ARINC 628 compliant wireless access point by Lufthansa Technik

- ARINC 600 is the predominant avionics packaging standard introducing the avionics Modular Concept Unit (MCU)
- ARINC 604 is a standard and guidance for the purpose of designing and implementing Built-In Test Equipment. The standard also describes the Centralized Fault Display System.
- ARINC 610B provides guidance for use of avionics equipment and software in simulators.
- ARINC 608 Design Guidance for Avionics Test Equipment: describes a standard avionics test system concept that will reduce the cost of test and repair of avionic systems.
- ARINC 615 is a family of standards covering "data loading", commonly used for transferring software and data to or from avionics devices. The ARINC 615 standard covers "data loading" over ARINC 429.
- ARINC 615A is a standard that covers a "data loading" protocol which can be used over various bus types such as Ethernet, CAN, and ARINC 664.
- ARINC 618 is a standard that covers a data transmission protocol called "Character Oriented Protocol".
- ARINC 619 is a standard that covers a data transmission protocol over ARINC 429 called "Bit Oriented Protocol".
- ARINC 620 is a standard that covers a data transmission protocol called "Datalink Ground System".
- ARINC 624 is a standard for aircraft onboard maintenance system (OMS). It uses ARINC 429 for data transmission between embedded equipments.
- ARINC 625 is an Industry Guide For Component Test Development and Management. It provides a standard approach for quality management of Test Procedure Generation within the commercial air transport industry.
- ARINC 628 is a standard for Cabin Equipment Interfaces
- ARINC 629 is a multi-transmitter data bus protocol where up to 120 terminals can share the same bus. It is installed on aircraft such as the Boeing 777, Airbus A330 and Airbus A340.
- ARINC 633 is the air-ground protocol for ACARS and IP networks used for AOC data exchanges between aircraft and the ground.
- ARINC 635 defines the protocols for the HFDL network of radios used for communication and messaging between aircraft and HF Ground Stations.
- ARINC 653 is a standard Real Time Operating System (RTOS) interface for partitioning of computer resources in the time and space domains. The standard also specifies Application Program Interfaces (APIs) for abstraction of the application from the underlying hardware and software.
- ARINC 660 defines avionics functional allocation and recommended architectures for CNS/ATM avionics.
- ARINC 661 defines the data structures used in an interactive cockpit display system (CDS), and the communication between the CDS and User Applications. The GUI definition is completely defined in binary definition files. The CDS software consists of a kernel capable of creating a hierarchical GUI specified in the definition files. The concepts used by ARINC 661 are similar to those used in user interface markup languages.
- ARINC 664, known for its implementation as AFDX (Avionics Full-Duplex Switched Ethernet), defines the use of a deterministic Ethernet network as an avionic databus in modern aircraft like the Airbus A380, the Airbus A350, the Sukhoi Superjet 100, the Bombardier CSeries, and the Boeing 787 Dreamliner.
- ARINC 665 This standard defines standards for loadable software parts and software transport media.
- ARINC 667 is a Guidance for the Management of Field Loadable Software.
- ARINC 668 Guidance For Tool and Test Equipment (TTE) Equivalency.

=== 700 Series ===
The 700 Series describes the form, fit, and function of avionics equipment installed predominately on transport category aircraft.

- ARINC 702A defines the Flight Management Systems (FMS)
- ARINC 704 defines the Inertial Reference System (IRS)
- ARINC 705 defines the Attitude and Heading Reference System (AHRS)
- ARINC 707 defines the Radio Altimeter (RALT)
- ARINC 708 is the standard for airborne weather radar. It defines the airborne weather radar characteristics for civil and military aircraft
- ARINC 709 defines Distance Measuring Equipment (DME)
- ARINC 717 defines the acquisition of flight data for recording
- ARINC 718 describes an Air Traffic Control Transponder (ATCRBS/MODE S)
- ARINC 724B defines the Aircraft Communications Addressing and Reporting System (ACARS)
- ARINC 735B defines the Traffic Computer with Traffic Alert and Collision Avoidance System (TCAS)
- ARINC 738 defines an integrated Air Data Inertial Reference Unit (ADIRU)
- ARINC 739 is the standard for a Multi-Purpose Control and Display Unit (MCDU) and interfaces.
- ARINC 740 defines airborne printers
- ARINC 741 is the standard for a first-generation L-band satellite data unit
- ARINC 743A defines a GNSS sensor receiver
- ARINC 744A defines a full-format airborne printer
- ARINC 746 is the standard for a cabin telecommunications unit, based on Q.931 and CEPT-E1
- ARINC 747 defines a Flight Data Recorder (FDR)
- ARINC 750 defines a VHF Digital Radio
- ARINC 755 defines a Multi-Mode Receiver (MMR) for approach and landing
- ARINC 756 defines a GNSS Navigation and Landing Unit
- ARINC 757 defines a Cockpit Voice Recorder (CVR)
- ARINC 759 defines an Aircraft Interface Device (AID)
- ARINC 760 defines a GNSS Navigator
- ARINC 761 is the standard for a second-generation L-band satellite data unit, also called Swift64 by operator Inmarsat
- ARINC 763 is the standard for a generic avionics file server and wireless access points
- ARINC 767 defines a combined recorder unit capable of data and voice
- ARINC 771 is the standard for the second-generation L-Band satellite data unit, also called Certus Broadband for the low Earth orbit (LEO) Iridium NEXT by operator Iridium
- ARINC 781 is the standard for a third-generation L-band satellite data unit, also called SwiftBroadband (SBB) by operator Inmarsat
- ARINC 791 defines a first generation of Ku and Ka band satellite data airborne terminal equipment.
- ARINC 792 defines a second generation of Ku and Ka band satellite data airborne terminal equipment.

=== 800 Series ===
The 800 Series comprises a set of aviation standards for aircraft, including fiber optics used in high-speed data buses.

- ARINC 800 is the first industry standard intended for characterization of aviation-grade high-speed (Gbps) Ethernet links. CABIN CONNECTORS AND CABLES Part 1 to Part 4
- ARINC 801 through 807 define the application of fiber optics on the aircraft.
- ARINC 810 is a standard for the integration of aircraft galley inserts and associated interfaces Title: Definition of Standard Interfaces for Galley Insert (GAIN) Equipment, Physical Interfaces.
- ARINC 811 provides a common understanding of information security concepts as they relate to airborne networks, and provides a framework for evaluating the security of airborne networked systems.
- ARINC 812 is a standard for the integration of aircraft galley inserts and associated interfaces
- ARINC 816 defines a database for airport moving maps
- ARINC 817 defines a low-speed digital video interface
- ARINC 818 defines a high-speed digital video interface standard developed for high bandwidth, low latency, uncompressed digital video transmission.
- ARINC 821 is a top-level networking definition describing aircraft domains, file servers and other infrastructure.
- ARINC 822 is the standard for Gatelink.
- ARINC 823 is a standard for end-to-end datalink encryption.
- ARINC 825 is a standard for Controller Area Network bus protocol for airborne use.
- ARINC 826 is a protocol for avionic data loading over a Controller Area Network bus.
- ARINC 827 specifies a crate format for electronic distribution of software parts for aircraft.
- ARINC 828 defines aircraft wiring provisions and electrical interface standards for electronic flight bag (EFB)
- ARINC 834 defines an aircraft data interface that sources data to Electronic Flight Bags, airborne file servers, etc.
- ARINC 836 describes modular rack-style aircraft cabin standard enclosures.
- ARINC 838 provides a standardized XML description for loadable software parts.
- ARINC 839 is a function definition of airborne manager of air-ground interface communications (MAGIC)
- ARINC 840 defines the Application Control Interface (ACI) used with an Electronic Flight Bag (EFB)
- ARINC 841 defines Media Independent Aircraft Messaging
- ARINC 842 provides guidance for usage of digital certificates on airplane avionics and cabin equipment.

== See also ==
- Annex: Acronyms and abbreviations in avionics
- RTCA
- AeroMobile
- Airline teletype system
- Collins Aerospace cyberattack, an attack which involved software developed by the formerly independent ARINC
