= ARINC 573 =

ARINC 573 is an avionics data bus standard developed by ARINC. It is mostly used with Flight Data Recorder that use 12bit words in continuous data stream encoded in Harvard biphase.

== See also ==
- ARINC 717, a possible successor to Arinc 573
