= TTE =

TTE may refer to:

== Medicine and science ==
- Transthoracic echocardiogram
- 1,1,2-Trichloro-1,2,2-trifluoroethane, chemical compound

== Transport ==
- Babullah Airport, Indonesia (by IATA code)
- Travelling ticket examiner, the title of train conductors in India.

== Other ==
- This Toilet Earth, a heavy metal album
- Time-Triggered Ethernet, a fault-tolerant strategy for synchronized time in Ethernet networks
- TotalEnergies, traded on the New York Stock Exchange and the Euronext Paris as TTE
- Toyota Team Europe
