= ARINC 828 =

Avionics interface standard

In avionics, ARINC 828 defines electronic flight bag (EFB) interfaces used in all types of aircraft. ARINC 828 specifies connectors, interwiring and signal types using MIL-DTL-38999 connectors which can be used to connect EFBs of all hardware classes with aircraft.

ARINC 828 combines classical aircraft interfaces like, ARINC 429 or ARINC 717 buses with PC technology like USB, DVI, LVDS, and Ethernet.

ARINC 828 was first adopted by the Airlines Electronic Engineering Committee (AEEC) in September 2007. The standard was supplemented on December 10, 2008 (ARINC828-1), December 18, 2009 (ARINC828-2), June 20, 2012 (ARINC828-3) and December 11, 2015 (ARINC828-4).
