= Biphasic =

Biphasic, meaning having two phases, may refer to:

- Phase (matter), in the physical sciences, a biphasic system, e.g. one involving liquid water and steam
- Biphasic sleep, a nap or siesta in addition to the usual sleep episode at night
- Phase (pharmacology)
- Biphasic disease
- Biphasic formulations of oral contraceptive pills

== See also ==
- Biphase (disambiguation)
- Phase (disambiguation)
