= Wilfried Elmenreich =

Wilfried Elmenreich (born 1973 in Fürstenfeld, Austria) is an Austrian researcher and professor of Smart Grids at the Alpen-Adria-Universität Klagenfurt.

== Biography ==
Wilfried Elmenreich studied computer science at the Vienna University of Technology where he received his master's degree in 1998. He became a research and teaching assistant at the Institute of Computer Engineering at Vienna University of Technology in 1999. He received his doctoral degree with distinction on the topic of time-triggered sensor fusion in 2002. From 1999 to 2007 he was the chief developer of the time-triggered fieldbus protocol TTP/A and the Smart Transducer Interface standard. In 2003, he started the international Workshop on Intelligent Solutions in Embedded Systems (WISES), which has since taken place annually. In 2004, he organized the Second IEEE International Conference on Computational Cybernetics (ICCC) in Vienna.

Elmenreich was a visiting researcher at the Vanderbilt University, Nashville, Tennessee in 2005 and at the CISTER/IPP-Hurray Research Unit at the Polytechnic Institute of Porto in 2007. By the end of 2007, he moved to the Alpen-Adria-Universität Klagenfurt to become a senior researcher at the Institute of Networked and Embedded Systems. Working in the area of cooperative relaying, he published two patents together with Helmut Adam and Christian Bettstetter. One result of the work on self-organizing systems yielded an open-source research tool named FREVO.

In 2008, he received Habilitation in the area of Computer Engineering from Vienna University of Technology. In Winter term 2012-2013 he was professor of complex systems engineering at the University of Passau. He has held a Professor of Smart Grids position at the Alpen-Adria-Universität Klagenfurt since April 2013. His research projects also affiliate him with the Lakeside Labs research cluster in Klagenfurt.

Wilfried Elmenreich is a member of the senate of the Alpen-Adria-Universität Klagenfurt, Senior Member of IEEE and counselor of Klagenfurt's IEEE student branch. In 2012, he organized the international Advent Programming Contest.

Wilfried was editor of 4 books and published over 100 papers in the field of networked and embedded systems. He maintains the research blogs "Self-Organizing Networked Systems", "The Smart Grid" and "Networking Embedded Systems".

== Research interests ==
- Smart Grids
- Sensor networks
- Self-organizing systems
- Evolutionary Algorithms and Organic Computing

== Selected publications ==
- W. Elmenreich (Hrsg.). Systemnahes Programmieren - C Programmierung unter Unix und Linux. UBooks Verlag, Augsburg, 2002. ISBN 978-3939359852.
- W. Elmenreich. Time-triggered smart transducer networks. IEEE Transactions on Industrial Informatics, 2(3):192–199, 2006.
- W. Elmenreich, N. Marchenko, H. Adam, C. Hofbauer, G. Brandner, C. Bettstetter, and M. Huemer. Building blocks of cooperative relaying in wireless systems. e & i, Springer, 125(10):353–359, 2008.
- W. Elmenreich (Hrsg.). Embedded Systems Engineering. Vienna University of Technology, Austria, Vienna, Austria, 2009. ISBN 978-3-902463-08-1.
- A. Sobe and W. Elmenreich. Replication and replacement in dynamic delivery networks. Complex Adaptive Systems Modeling, 2013.
