= ARINC 717 =

Standard for digital flight data recorders

ARINC 717 is a standard that defines the data format of digital flight data recorders, issued by the company Aeronautical Radio, Incorporated (ARINC). It specifies the communication between various avionics systems and sensors and the flight data recorder. It replaces the older ARINC 573 standard, which was based on analog inputs. It allows for more data and real-time recording.

Digital Expandable Flight Data Acquisition and Recording System (DEFDARS) flight recorder output signals include the following:

- Primary Output – ARINC 717 Harvard biphase encoding
- Auxiliary Output – ARINC 429 (DITS) bi-polar encoding

ARINC 747 defines an alternate solid state recorder that can be used with an ARINC 717 installation.

DEFDARS includes the following component functions

- Digital Flight Acquisition Unit (DFAU)
- Digital Flight Data Recorder (DFDR)
- Accelerometer
- Flight Data Entry Panel (optional) for entry of flight data
