= Boblbee =

Boblbee (also expressed as BOBLBE·E when used on their products; English: /ˈbɒbəlbiː/, BAH-bəl-bee) is a corporation that began in 1997 as a think tank for research and development of sports and recreational equipment. This led to the design and manufacture of hardshell and softshell backpacks. Their hardshell backpacks are best known for their impact reduction capabilities (between 86% and 93% depending on the model), unusual design, and accompanying accessory range. They have received two Good Design Awards. In 2015, the company became part of the Point 65 Sweden, and their product range was re-launched under the new brand name. Their flagship store & corporate headquarters is located in Stockholm, Sweden.

== History ==
The creator of the Boblbee packs, industrial designer Jonas Blanking, has a background in the automotive and sports industries having worked with such companies as Alfa Romeo, Volvo, Porsche and sports-gear maker Salomon. As an outdoorsman, he had trouble with conventional backpack designs that left expensive electronics or paperwork vulnerable to damage in the event of an accident or inclement weather. He set out to design a new type of backpack, unlike those considered suitable for sports such as hiking and biking, that would have to be rigid, protective, and provide adequate volume.

Blanking looked to the air cargo industry for the first iteration of the backpack, which led him to employ the use of aluminium and ABS plastics. Prototypes were developed in 1996. The first prototype featured a concept in which the rigid outer shell could be incorporated in such a way that the outside surface area is as useful as the internal volume. Fasteners located all over the pack let the wearer attach a skateboard or snowboard with simple straps that can be taken off with ease. Later, accessories were made to fit around the sides and the crevasse situated at the bottom of the pack for lumbar support.

The concept was finalized in April 1998, leading to the birth of the Boblbee monocoque hardshell backpack, now known as the Megalopolis. Boblbee then went on to release several more hardshell & softshell designs, all with varying features for transporting sports equipment, camera gear, laptops & more.

In July 2014 the company became part of Point 65 Sweden and moved its HQ from Malmo to Solna. In spring 2015 the complete range of products was relaunched under the new brand name 'Point 65'. Currently the backpacks are sold worldwide, through the official website or various authorised resellers.

== Megalopolis ==
The Megalopolis was the first backpack released by Boblbee. It uses a design that reminds some of a toboggan or even a jetpack. The futuristic hardshell plastic form of the pack the Megalopolis (and the identical but smaller Peoples Delite) have appeared as accessories in movies such as Charlie's Angels, Hitch, Jason X, The Fast And The Furious, The Italian Job and Bicentennial Man.

The original Megalopolis came in two versions, the Executive and Sport models. The difference between the two was the color selections - the Sport version has in-mold primary colors, whereas the Executive has been painted and lacquered in a myriad of colors. The Executive has a partition of the interior, where the Sport has a removable laptop sleeve instead of an actual laptop compartment.

The Megalopolis Series was renamed the Boblbee GTO Series (20L & 25L packs) after the company became Point 65 Sweden. In 2016 the design was updated again and the GTO has been changed to the GTX series (today's current version).

== Target audience ==
The Boblbee backpacks are built to withstand high impacts, protecting both the spine of the wearer and the contents of the pack. Motorcycle riders, skiers/snowboarders, mountain bikers or rock climbers are ideally suited to the extra security provided back protector and rigid outer shell. The packs are also widely used in urban situations, popular with cyclists, couriers, DJ's, business people & travellers to keep laptops or camera equipment protected while on-the-go.

Popularity has been achieved particularly in Japan where a big portion of Boblbee items are sold. Boblbee Japan has a website separate from the main site which features products exclusive to that region.
