= Bureau de normalisation de l'aéronautique et de l'espace =

The Bureau de normalisation de l'aéronautique et de l'espace (BNAE) is a standard body for standardization in the field of Aeronautics and space construction. The BNAE has an AFNOR delegation for establishing standards.

== History ==
The BNAE was created in 1941. It has been recognized as a standardization body by the French government since 1984.

== Publications ==
The BNAE publications are called Recommandation générales (general recommendations). The most well known published recommendation is the RG Aéro 00040 (Recommandation générale pour la spécification de management de programme) which deals with Aeronautics Program management.
