= ARINC 708 =

Airborne weather radar specification

ARINC 708 is a specification for airborne pulse Doppler weather radar systems primarily found on commercial aircraft.

== Technical description ==
ARINC 708 uses a data transfer method using transformer-coupled Manchester encoded signal, like the MIL-STD-1553 protocol. Termination of the bus is essential for good signal quality. Furthermore, the bitstream is continuous, requiring good re-synchronization to the bit stream. Data frames are 1600 bits long with the header portion of the frame consisting of parameters such as range, tilt, gain, status, etc. The data portion is organized into 512 range bins per scan angle value. Each (three-bit) range bin contains a color value to indicate the intensity at that position. Settings for the ARINC 708 system is typically controlled using an ARINC 429 interface. Details available from ARINC: www.aviation-ia.com/aeec

== Avionics weather radar systems ==
Commercial Weather Radar Systems consist of the following items:

- Antenna
- T-R Unit (Transmit-Receive Unit)
- CDU (Control-Display Unit)
- Display

== Variations ==
Variations from the standard specification include variable word length and non-standard amplitude values. Some implementations also require non-standard re-synchronization.

== See also ==
- ARINC 429 protocol used to control radar.
- MIL-STD-1553 protocol is electrically similar to ARINC 708.
