= Elektroniksystem- und Logistik-GmbH =

German IT and other services company

ESG Group
- Company type: GmbH
- Founded: 1967 in Munich, Germany
- Headquarters: Fürstenfeldbruck
- Key people: Christoph Otten; Dr. Mihaela Seidl
- Revenue: €323 Mio. (2018)
- Number of employees: >2200 (2018)
- Divisions: Automotive, Aviation, Logistics, Military (business areas)
- Website: http://esg.de./

ESG (Electronic System and Logistics Group) is a limited liability company (GmbH) founded in 1967 in Munich. The company is headquartered in Germany and the United States. It employs over 1800 people. The company offers professional services primarily in the Automotive, Aviation, Logistics, and Military sectors.

== History ==
In 1967 AEG-Telefunken, Rohde & Schwarz, SEL (Standard Elektrik Lorenz) and Siemens established the ESG Elektronik-System-Gesellschaft. In 1992, after a merger with FEG Flug-Elektronik-Gesellschaft, the consolidated company was named ESG Elektroniksystem- und Logistik-GmbH.

== Offices ==
- Germany : Berlin, Bonn, Cologne, Fürstenfeldbruck, Hamburg, Ingolstadt, Koblenz, Weißenthurm, Munich, Raunheim, Stuttgart, Wolfsburg
- USA : Starke, Florida

== Subsidiaries ==
- ESG Aerosystems Inc. (100%)
- ESG Consulting GmbH (100%)
- CYOSS GmbH (100%)
- ServiceXpert GmbH (100%)
