= Fully switched network =

Network with a dedicated connection to each workstation

A fully switched network is a computer network which uses only network switches rather than Ethernet hubs on Ethernet networks. The switches provide a dedicated connection to each workstation. A switch allows for many conversations to occur simultaneously. Before switches, networks based on hubs data could only allow transmission in one direction at a time, this was called half-duplex. By using a switch this restriction is removed; full-duplex communication is maintained and the network is collision free. This means that data can now be transmitted in both directions at the same time. Fully switched networks employ either twisted-pair or fiber-optic cabling, both of which use separate conductors for sending and receiving data. In this type of environment, Ethernet nodes can forgo the collision detection process and transmit at will, since they are the only potential devices that can access the medium. This means that a fully switched network is a collision-free environment.

The core function of a switch is to allow each workstation to communicate only with the switch instead of with each other. This in turn means that data can be sent from workstation to switch and from switch to workstation simultaneously. The core purpose of a switch is to decongest network flow to the workstations so that the connections can transmit more effectively; receiving transmissions that were only specific to their network address. With the network decongested and transmitting data in both directions simultaneously this can in fact double network speed and capacity when two workstations are trading information. For example, if your network speed is 5 Mbit/s, then each workstation is able to simultaneously transfer data at 5 Mbit/s.

== See also ==
- Network performance
