= Taxi positional awareness =

Electronic map used by aircraft whilst taxiing

Taxi positional awareness (abbreviated TPA) is an electronic map used by aircraft whilst taxiing. An example is the Electronic flight bag (EFB) produced by Boeing and Jeppesen.
