= Obvio! 828 =

The Obvio! 828 is a car made by Obvio!. The car was originally made by Dacon as Dacon 828. Dacon was originally the Brazilian representative of Porsche, but when imports were prohibited in 1976 they developed a car of their own. The name was chosen to remind one of Porsche 928 and the Dacon 828 used rear lights and other Porsche parts for their car. The Dacon version was only sold between 1983 and July 1994, only 47 cars were sold. It was then powered by a 1.6 litre VW boxer engine connected to a 4 speed gearbox.

It is a mid-engine design using a continuously variable transmission (CVT) transmission (that also can mimic a 6 speed sequential gearbox) and powered by a 4-cylinder, inline 16 valve 1.6 liter 115 hp (86 kW) Tritec engine (high power version with either 170 hp (127 kW) or 250 hp (186 kW) are also available). They are described as "high performance urban cars". Fuel consumption is 12.5 km/L (35 mpg_{‑imp}; 29 mpg_{‑US}) in the city or 17.3 km/L (49 mpg_{‑imp}; 41 mpg_{‑US}) in highways. It is a flexible-fuel vehicle that runs on either neat ethanol fuel (E100) or gasoline or any mix thereof.

The chassis is designed as a series of ellipses to be strong, yet low weight. A system called "Niess Elliptical Survive Rings". The cars have three seats and are fitted with airbags. It has McPherson suspensions and disc brakes all round. The internal and external panels of the bodyshell is made of ABS/PMMA plastic. It uses scissor doors and also has a Boblbee backpack space integrated into the design.

The 828 has a list price of US$14,000. Extras offered are air conditioning, individual seats, power windows/rear mirror/door lock package, leather seats and an iMobile Carputer.

== Hybrid version ==
The Obvio! 828H is a concept hybrid electric version that runs on a flex-fuel engines and it was presented in Rio de Janeiro in November 2010.
