= Aircraft Data Network =

Aircraft Data Network (ADN), as defined in the Airlines Electronic Engineering Committee (AEEC)'s ARINC 664 specification, is a standardized approach to data networking within commercial aircraft. The specification adapts commercial off-the-shelf networking standards, like those used in everyday computers and the internet, to meet the specific requirements of aviation. ARINC 664 details how common networking devices—such as bridges, switches, routers, and hubs—can be used within an aircraft's network to ensure reliable and efficient data transfer between avionics systems. This specification leverages established internet and IEEE networking standards and is based on the Open Systems Interconnection (OSI) model, providing a framework for interoperability between different aircraft systems.

== Structure ==
The specification is organized in multiple parts, as follows:

- Part 1 – Systems Concepts and Overview
- Part 2 – Ethernet Physical and Data-Link Layer Specifications
- Part 3 – Internet-based Protocols and Services
- Part 4 – Internet-based Address Structure and Assigned Numbers
- Part 5 – Network Domain Characteristics and Functional Elements
- Part 6 – Reserved;
- Part 7 – Deterministic Networks
- Part 8 – Upper Layer Protocol Services
