= Harvard biphase =

Harvard biphase is a magnetic run length code for encoding magnetic tape. It is one of the formats employed in forming the digital bits of logic one and logic zero, along with non-return-to-zero (NRZ) and bipolar-return-to-zero (RZ) formats. Each bit in the Harvard biphase format undergoes change at its trailing edge and this transpires either from high to zero or zero to high independently of its value.

== FDR ==
Harvard biphase has previously been used for digital flight data recorder (FDR) where 12-bit words per second are recorded onto magnetic tape using Harvard biphase code. The data are encoded in frames and each of these contains a snapshot of the avionics system in the aircraft. For Harvard biphase, a phase transition in the middle of the bit cell indicates that the bit is 1. No transition indicates that the bit is 0. There is also a phase transition at the start of each bit cell. The ARINC 573 serves as a standard for FDRs that feature continuous data stream encoded in Harvard biphase.

== See also ==
- ARINC 573
