= Flight control =

Flight control or Flight Control may refer to:

- Flight control surfaces, the movable surfaces that control the flight of an airplane
- Aircraft flight control system, flight control surfaces, the respective cockpit controls, and the systems linking the two
- Helicopter flight controls, similar systems for a helicopter
- Triangle control frame, the A-frame-like handle used to control hang gliders
- Kite control systems
- Flight Control, an iPhone game
