= ARINC 629 =

Communications Protocol and Avionics Bus

The ARINC 629 computer bus was introduced in May 1995 and is used on aircraft such as the Boeing 777 and the Airbus A320 series.

The ARINC 629 bus operates as a multiple-source, multiple-sink system; each terminal can transmit data to, and receive data from, every other terminal on the data bus. This allows much more freedom in the exchange of data between units in the avionics system. ARINC 629 has the ability to accommodate up to a total of 128 terminals on a data bus and supports a data rate of 2 Mbit/s. It is available in either current or optic mode, over un-shielded, twisted cables.

Each terminal can send 31 word strings, and each word string can have a total of 256 words.

The ARINC 629 data bus was developed by the Airlines Electronic Engineering Committee (AEEC) to replace the ARINC 429 bus. The ARINC 629 data bus was based on the Boeing DATAC bus.

A unique feature of ARINC 629 is it uses inductive couplers to connect the RTs (Remote Terminals) to the bus.
