= GE Aviation Systems =

Subsidiary of GE Aerospace

- Type: Subsidiary
- Industry: Engineering
- Founded: January 3, 1963; 63 years ago
- Headquarters: Cincinnati, Ohio, United States
- Number of employees: 37,800 (2007)
- Parent: GE Aerospace
- Website: www.geaviationsystems.com

GE Aviation Systems (formerly Smiths Aerospace) is an American aerospace engineering, aircraft engine and aircraft parts manufacturer.

Smiths Aerospace was formerly one of four business units of Smiths Group plc., an engineering company and constituent of the FTSE 100 share index. However, it was announced on January 15, 2007 that Smiths Group was divesting Smiths Aerospace to General Electric for US $4.8 billion. Smiths Aerospace, which was an important supplier, became an operating subsidiary of GE Aviation. This acquisition reportedly gives the combined unit the clout to resist pricing pressures from its two largest customers, Boeing Commercial Airplanes and Airbus. Analysts further assert that it will enable General Electric to acquire assets similar to those it desired in its failed bid for Honeywell in 2000. GE Aviation completed the transaction on May 4, 2007.

== Products ==
- Its electronic and mechanical systems businesses include integrated modular avionics, flight management and stores management systems, recording and analyzing of voice, video and data. Crew information and mission planning. Other products include power generation and distribution, fuel gauging, management and aerial refueling systems and environmental conditioning. Systems essential to aircraft performance includes flight controls, thrust reversers, landing gear and hydraulic systems.
- The engine component capabilities include engine ring technology, supplying complex gas turbine engine components to every major engine program worldwide.
- The company also operates a global customer services organization that supports 1,500 customers in 140 countries through a network of local centers.

The company is involved with Boeing's KC-767 and F/A-18E/F Super Hornet, Lockheed Martin's F-35 Lightning II, F-22 Raptor, and C-130J Hercules, and the Eurofighter Typhoon. Smiths engine components equip many major military and civil gas turbine engines, providing critical technologies from intake to exhaust.

== History ==
Smiths Aerospace was initially formed from the takeover of TI Group's aerospace activities, including firms such as Dowty Rotol. In 2000, they acquired the former electronics and avionics division of Fairchild Defense from Orbital Sciences corporation.
