= North Atlantic Tracks =

Transatlantic flight routes

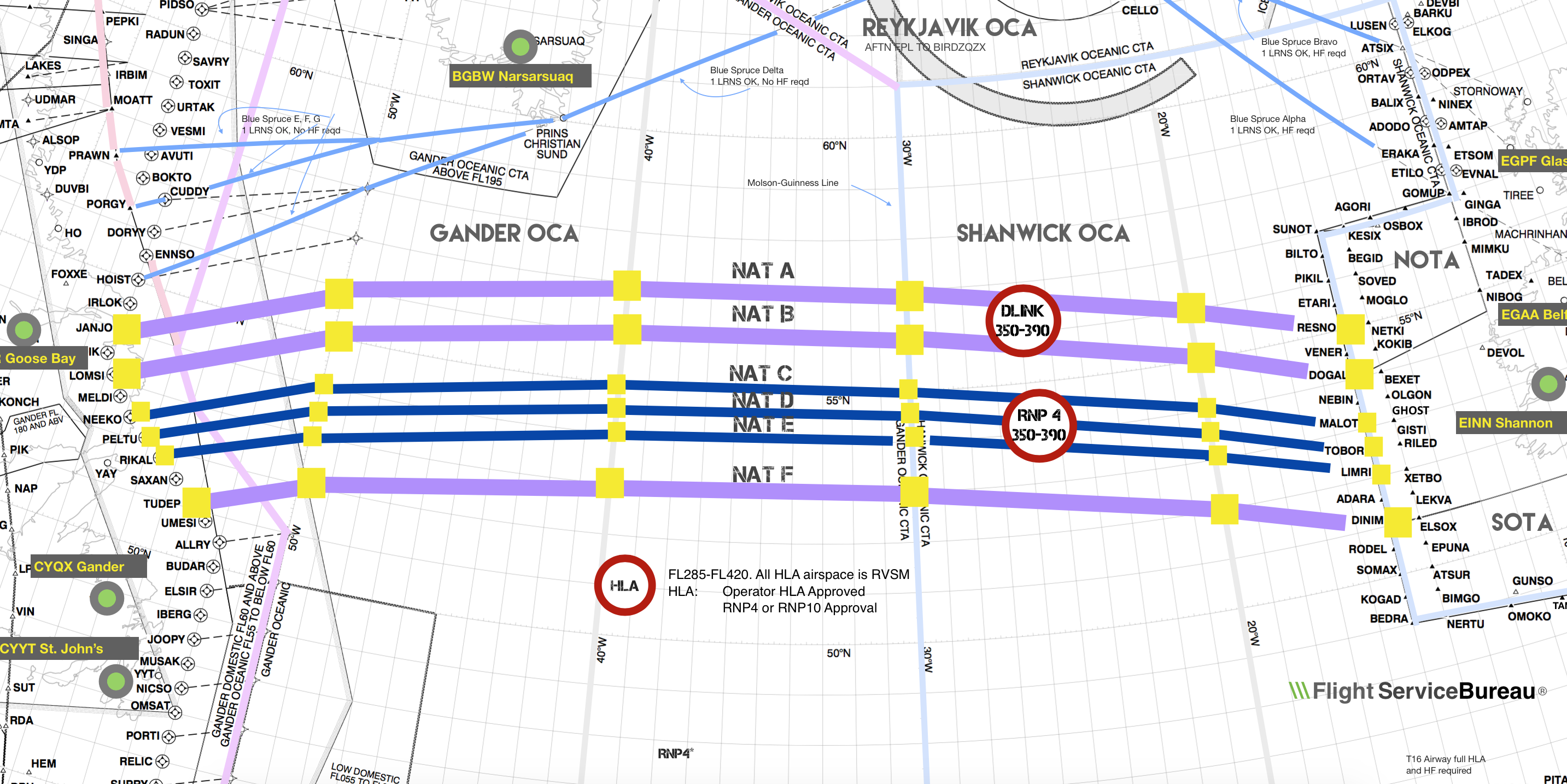
North Atlantic Tracks for the westbound crossing of February 24, 2017, with the new reduced lateral separation minima (RLAT) Tracks shown in blue

The North Atlantic Tracks, officially titled the North Atlantic Organised Track System (NAT-OTS), are a structured set of transatlantic flight routes that stretch from eastern North America to western Europe across the Atlantic Ocean, within the North Atlantic airspace region. They ensure that aircraft are separated over the ocean, where there is little radar coverage. These heavily travelled routes are used by aircraft flying between North America and Europe. While it was formerly required that all aircraft file and fly a NAT to cross the ocean, this is no longer required, though ATC has the right to override a flight plan and require an aircraft to fly a track.

The routes are used for aircraft operating between the altitudes of 29,000 and 41,000 ft (8,800 and 12,500 m) inclusive. ATC-assigned altitudes on the NATS are never based on feet or meters: instead, flight levels (FL) are assigned on NATS, just as in other flights above the international transition altitude of 18,000 ft (5,500 m), being between FL340 and FL400, inclusive.

Entrance and movement along these tracks is controlled by special oceanic control centres to maintain separation between aircraft. The primary purpose of these routes is to allow air traffic control to effectively separate the aircraft. Because of the volume of NAT traffic, allowing aircraft to choose their own co-ordinates would make the air traffic control (ATC) task far more complex. They are aligned in such a way as to minimize any head winds and maximize tail winds impact on the aircraft.

This results in much more efficiency by reducing fuel burn and flight time. To make such efficiencies possible, the routes are created twice daily to take account of the shifting of the winds aloft and the principal traffic flow, eastward from North America during the evening, published at or about 1400 UTC for aircraft to cross 30W between 0100 UTC and 0800 UTC, and westward from Europe in the morning, published at or about 2200 UTC for aircraft to cross 30W between 1130 UTC and 1900 UTC.

== History ==
In 1898, the first implementation of an organised track system across the North Atlantic was for commercial shipping, when the North Atlantic Track Agreement was signed. After World War II, increasing commercial airline traffic across the North Atlantic led to difficulties for ATC in separating aircraft effectively. In 1961, the first occasional use of NAT Tracks was made. In 1965, the publication of NAT Tracks became a daily feature, allowing controllers to force traffic onto fixed track structures in order to effectively separate the aircraft by time, altitude, and latitude. In 1966, the two agencies at Shannon and Prestwick merged to become Shanwick, with responsibility out to 30°W longitude.

Other historical dates include:

- 1977 – Minimum navigation performance specifications (MNPS) introduced
- 1981 – Longitudinal separation reduced to 10 minutes
- 1996 – Global Positioning System (GPS) approved for navigation on NAT; OMEGA withdrawn
- 1997 – Reduced vertical separation minima (RVSM) introduced on the NAT
- 2006 – Controller–pilot data link communications (CPDLC) overtakes HF as primary comms method
- 2011 – Longitudinal separation reduced to 5 minutes
- 2015 – Reduced lateral separation minima (RLAT) introduced
- 2019 - ASEPS (Advanced surveillance enhanced procedural separation) introduced following introduction of satellite-based ADS-B.

== Route planning ==
The routing of the tracks is based on a number of factors, the most important being the jetstream—aircraft going from North America to Europe experience tailwinds caused by the jetstream. Tracks to Europe use the jetstream to their advantage by routing along the strongest tailwinds.

Because of the difference in ground speed caused by the jetstream, westbound flights tend to be longer in duration than their eastbound counterparts. The North Atlantic Tracks are published by Shanwick Centre (EGGX) and Gander Centre (CZQX), in consultation with other adjacent air traffic control agencies and airlines.

The day before the tracks being published, airlines that fly the North Atlantic regularly send a preferred route message (PRM) to Gander and Shanwick. This allows the ATC agency to know what the route preferences are of the bulk of the North Atlantic traffic.

== Provision of North Atlantic Track air traffic control ==
Air traffic controllers responsible for the Shanwick flight information region (FIR) are based at the Shanwick Oceanic Control Centre at Prestwick Centre in Ayrshire, Scotland. Air traffic controllers responsible for the Gander FIR are based at the Gander Oceanic Control Centre in Gander, Newfoundland and Labrador, Canada.

== Flight planning ==
Western Boundary – Gander

Eastern Boundary – Shanwick

Using a NAT Track, even when they are active in the direction an aircraft is flying, used to be required: due to technological advancements, filing and flying a Track is no longer mandatory, unless otherwise assigned by ATC. However, less than optimum altitude assignment, or a reroute, is likely to occur.

Therefore, most operators choose to file a flight plan on a NAT Track. The correct method is to file a flight plan with an Oceanic Entry Point (OEP), then the name of the NAT Track, e.g. "NAT A" for NAT Track Alpha, and the Oceanic Exit Point (OXP).

A typical routing would be: DCT KONAN UL607 EVRIN DCT MALOT/M081F350 DCT 53N020W 52N030W NATA JOOPY/N0462F360 N276C TUSKY DCT PLYMM. Oceanic boundary points for the NAT Tracks are along the FIR boundary of Gander on the west side, and Shanwick on the east side.

While the routes change daily, they maintain a series of entrance and exit waypoints which link into the airspace system of North America and Europe. Each route is uniquely identified by a letter of the alphabet. Westbound tracks, valid from 11:30 UTC to 19:00 UTC at 30W, are indicated by the letters A, B, C, D etc. (as far as M if necessary, omitting I), where A is the northernmost track. Eastbound tracks, valid from 01:00 UTC to 08:00 UTC at 30W, are indicated by the letters Z, Y, X, W etc. (as far as N if necessary, omitting O), where Z is the southernmost track.

Waypoints on the route are identified by named waypoints (or "fixes") and by the crossing of degrees of latitude and longitude (such as "54/40", indicating 54°N latitude, 40°W longitude).

A ‘random route’ must have a waypoint every 10 degrees of longitude. Aircraft can also join an outer track half way along.

Since 2017, aircraft can plan any flight level in the NAT HLA (high level airspace), with no need to follow ICAO standard cruising levels.

== Flying the routes ==
Prior to departure, airline flight dispatchers/flight operations officers will determine the best track based on destination, aircraft weight, aircraft type, prevailing winds and air traffic control route charges. The aircraft will then contact the Oceanic Center controller before entering oceanic airspace and request the track giving the estimated time of arrival at the entry point. The Oceanic Controllers then calculate the required separation distances between aircraft and issue clearances to the pilots. It may be that the track is not available at that altitude or time so an alternate track or altitude will be assigned. Aircraft cannot change assigned course or altitude without permission.

Contingency plans exist within the North Atlantic Track system to account for any operational issues that occur. For example, if an aircraft can no longer maintain the speed or altitude it was assigned, the aircraft can move off the track route and fly parallel to its track, but well away from other aircraft. Pilots on the North Atlantic Tracks are required to inform air traffic control of any deviations in altitude or speed necessitated by avoiding weather, such as thunderstorms or turbulence.

Despite advances in navigation technology, such as GPS and lateral navigation (LNAV), errors can and do occur. While typically not dangerous, two aircraft can violate separation requirements. On a busy day, aircraft are spaced approximately ten minutes apart. With the introduction of the traffic collision avoidance system (TCAS), aircraft traveling along these tracks can monitor the relative position of other aircraft, thereby increasing the safety of all track users.

Since there is little radar coverage in the middle of the Atlantic, aircraft must report in as they cross various waypoints along each track, their anticipated crossing time of the next waypoint, and the waypoint after that. These reports enable the Oceanic Controllers to maintain separation between aircraft. These reports can be made to dispatchers via a satellite communications link (CPDLC) or via high frequency (HF) radios.

In the case of HF reports, each aircraft operates using selective calling (SELCAL). The use of SELCAL allows an aircraft crew to be notified of incoming communications even when the aircraft's radio has been muted. Thus, crew members need not devote their attention to continuous radio listening.

If the aircraft is equipped with automatic dependent surveillance, (ADS-C & ADS-B), voice position reports on HF are no longer necessary, as automatic reports are downlinked to the Oceanic Control Centre. In this case, a SELCAL check only has to be performed when entering the oceanic area and with any change in radio frequency to ensure a working backup system for the event of a datalink failure.

== Maximizing traffic capacity ==
Increased aircraft density can be achieved by allowing closer vertical spacing of aircraft through participation in the RVSM program.

In June 2004, the strategic lateral offset procedure (SLOP) was introduced to the North Atlantic airspace to reduce the risk of mid-air collision by spreading out aircraft laterally. It reduces the risk of collision for non-normal events such as operational altitude deviation errors and turbulence induced altitude deviations. In essence, the procedure demands that aircraft in North Atlantic airspace fly track centreline or one or two nautical mile offsets to the right of centreline only. The choice is left up to the pilot.

In November 2015, a new procedure allowing for reduced lateral separation minima (RLAT) was introduced. RLAT reduces the standard distance between NAT tracks from 60 to 30 nautical miles (69 to 35 mi; 111 to 56 km), or from one whole degree of latitude to a half degree. This allows more traffic to operate on the most efficient routes, reducing fuel cost. The first RLAT tracks were published in December 2015.

The tracks reverse direction twice daily. In the daylight, all traffic on the tracks operates in a westbound flow. At night, the tracks flow eastbound towards Europe. This is done to accommodate traditional airline schedules. Departures from North America to Europe are scheduled for departure in the evening, allowing passengers to arrive at their destination in the morning.

Westbound departures typically leave Europe between early morning to late afternoon and arrive in North America from early afternoon to late evening. In this manner, a single aircraft can be efficiently utilized by flying to Europe at night, and to North America in the day. The tracks are updated daily and their position may alternate on the basis of a variety of variable factors, but predominantly due to weather systems.

The US Federal Aviation Administration, Nav Canada, and UK National Air Traffic Services (NATS) publish a Notice to Airmen (NOTAM) daily with the routes and flight levels to be used in each direction of travel, available online.

== Space-based ADS-B ==
At the end of March 2019, Nav Canada and the UK's National Air Traffic Services (NATS) activated the Aireon space-based ADS-B relayed every few seconds by 450 nmi (830 km) high Iridium satellites to air traffic control centers. Aircraft separation can be lowered from 40 nmi (74 km) longitudinally to 14–17 nmi (26–31 km), while lateral separations will be reduced from 23 to 19 nmi (43 to 35 km) in October and to 15 nmi (28 km) in November 2020.

In the three following months, 31,700 flights could fly at their optimum speeds, saving up to 400–650 kg (880–1,430 lb) of fuel per crossing. Capacity is increased as NATS expects 16% more flights by 2025, while predicting that 10% of traffic will use the Organized Track System in the coming years, down from 38% today.

In 2018, 500,000 flights went through; annual fuel savings are expected around 38,800 t (85,500,000 lb), and may improve later.

== Concorde ==
Concorde did not travel on the North Atlantic Tracks, as it flew between 45,000 and 60,000 ft (14,000 and 18,000 m), a much higher altitude than subsonic airliners. The weather variations at these altitudes were so minor that Concorde followed the same track each day. These fixed tracks were known as 'Track Sierra Mike' (SM) for westbound flights and 'Track Sierra November' (SN) for eastbounds, with an additional 'Track Sierra Oscar' (SO) used if necessary. An additional route, 'Track Sierra Papa' (SP), was used for seasonal British Airways flights from London Heathrow to/from Barbados.

== See also ==
- Pacific Organized Track System
