= Satellite-based ADS-B =

Satellite-based reception of aircraft ADS-B signals

Satellite-based ADS-B (also space-based ADS-B) is the reception of Automatic Dependent Surveillance–Broadcast (ADS-B) signals transmitted by aircraft, by receivers carried on satellites in low Earth orbit (LEO) rather than by ground stations.Although the signals were designed primarily for reception by other aircraft and terrestrial stations, 1090 MHz Extended Squitter transmissions can also be detected from orbit by suitably designed satellite receivers and relayed to air navigation service providers (ANSPs). Space-based reception extends ADS-B-based air traffic surveillance from the roughly 30% of the Earth's surface covered by terrestrial radar and ground ADS-B receivers to the entire globe, including the oceanic, polar and remote-continental airspace where controllers previously depended on procedural separation and pilot-reported position updates.

The first space-based reception of ADS-B signals was demonstrated in 2013 by the European Space Agency's Proba-V satellite, and was followed by CubeSat experiments developed by GomSpace and Aalborg University. The first operational service was launched in March 2019 by Aireon, a joint venture between Iridium Communications and several ANSPs, after Harris-built ADS-B receiver payloads were hosted on all 75 second-generation Iridium NEXT satellites. NATS and Nav Canada activated the service over the North Atlantic on 27 March 2019, and used the new surveillance to implement reduced aircraft separation minima under the ICAO Advanced Surveillance-Enhanced Procedural Separation (ASEPS) standards.

The first space-based reception of ADS-B signals was demonstrated in 2013 by the European Space Agency's Proba-V satellite, and was followed by CubeSat experiments developed by GomSpace and Aalborg University. The first operational service was launched in March 2019 by Aireon, a joint venture between Iridium Communications and several ANSPs, after Harris-built ADS-B receiver payloads were hosted on all 75 second-generation Iridium NEXT satellites. NATS and Nav Canada activated the service over the North Atlantic on 27 March 2019, and used the new surveillance to implement reduced aircraft separation minima under the ICAO Advanced Surveillance-Enhanced Procedural Separation (ASEPS) standards.

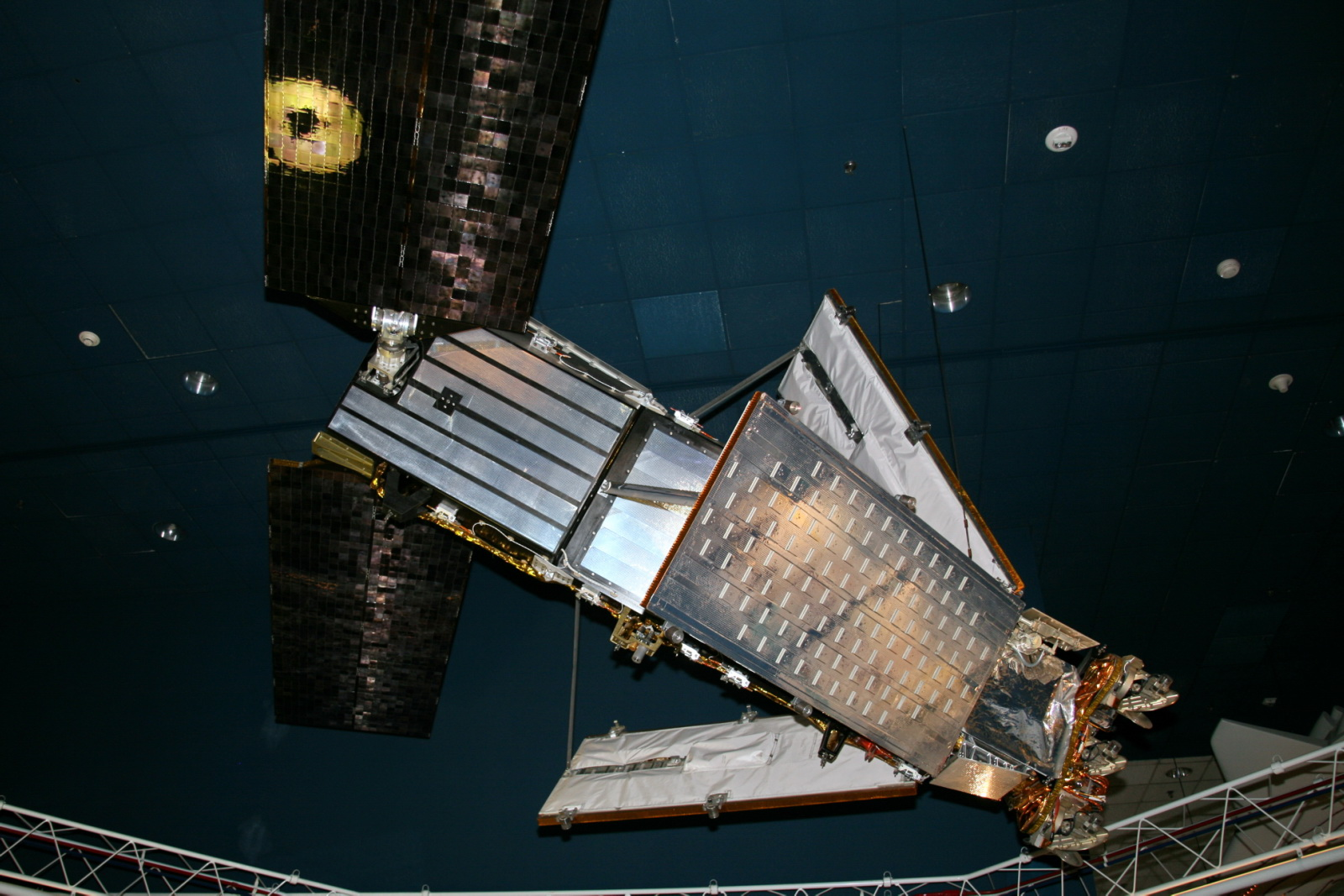
An early Iridium satellite prototype on display at the National Air and Space Museum. Aireon's operational satellite-based ADS-B service later used hosted receivers aboard the second-generation Iridium NEXT constellation.

== Background ==
ADS-B is a cooperative-surveillance technology in which an aircraft determines its position via satellite navigation and broadcasts it, together with identity and velocity information, on 1090 MHz (1090ES) or, for general aviation in the United States, on 978 MHz (UAT). Ground-based ADS-B receivers and secondary surveillance radar cover only the populated continents and adjacent coastal waters; over the open ocean, the Arctic and large parts of Africa, Australia and the Pacific, controllers have traditionally relied on position reports transmitted by pilots over HF voice or via FANS-1/A data link every 10 to 14 minutes, with procedural separation minima of 40nmi longitudinally and up to 60 nmi laterally between aircraft.

== Early experiments ==
=== Proba-V (2013) ===
The first ADS-B receiver to operate in orbit flew on Proba-V, a European Space Agency technology-demonstration mission launched on 7 May 2013 from the Guiana Space Centre on a Vega launch vehicle. The receiver was developed by the German Aerospace Center (DLR) with ground processing support from Luxembourg-based operator SES. By mid-2015, Proba-V had detected more than 25 million ADS-B position messages from aircraft worldwide, which ESA described as a "technical world first" in the satellite-based monitoring of air traffic.

=== GOMX-1 and GOMX-3 ===
GomSpace of Aalborg, Denmark, in collaboration with Aalborg University and DSE Airport Solutions, flew the 2U CubeSat GOMX-1 (launched 21 November 2013), which carried a software-defined radio payload to receive 1090ES signals over oceanic regions. The follow-on GOMX-3, a 3U CubeSat developed for ESA, was deployed from the International Space Station in October 2015 after launch on the HTV-5 cargo mission and carried an improved ADS-B receiver alongside an L-band software-defined radio.

== Aireon and Iridium NEXT ==
=== Joint venture and financing ===
Aireon LLC was formed in 2011 by Iridium Communications together with a group of ANSP partners — Nav Canada, NATS, ENAV, Naviair and the Irish Aviation Authority, later joined by Isavia — to deploy and operate a global space-based ADS-B service. The formal joint-venture agreement between Iridium and Nav Canada was completed on 19 November 2012; Nav Canada committed up to $150& million over five tranches to acquire a 51% stake in the venture.

=== Receiver design ===
The Aireon payload is a 1090 MHz Extended Squitter receiver built by Harris Corporation (later part of L3Harris Technologies). Harris announced completion of all 81 ADS-B payloads on 1 June 2016 ahead of schedule; the units were destined for the 66 operational satellites, 9 on-orbit spares and 6 ground spares of the Iridium NEXT constellation. Decoded messages are routed through Iridium's Ka-band cross-links and ground gateways to Aireon's distribution network, which delivers position reports to ANSPs and to commercial users via FlightAware.

=== Deployment ===
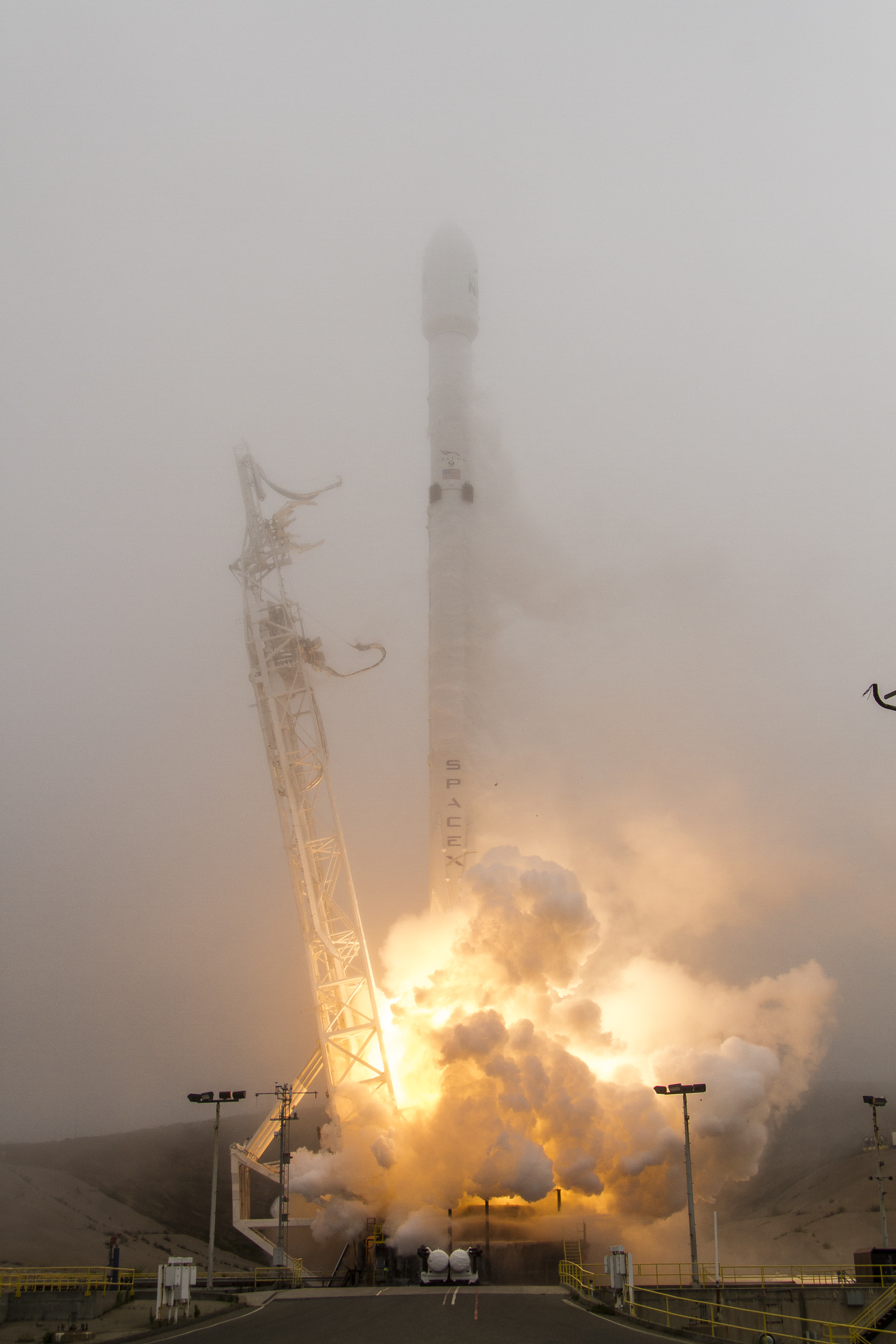
A SpaceX Falcon 9 launches ten Iridium NEXT satellites from Vandenberg Air Force Base in June 2017. Aireon's ADS-B receivers were hosted aboard the Iridium NEXT constellation.

Aireon receivers were hosted as a secondary payload on each of the 75 Iridium NEXT satellites built by Thales Alenia Space. The constellation was launched on SpaceX Falcon 9 vehicles from Vandenberg in 8 batches between January 2017 and 11 January 2019, when the final 10 satellites completed the constellation of 66 operational vehicles and 9 on-orbit spares.

=== Ownership ===
In May 2026, Iridium Communications announced a definitive agreement to acquire Aireon, buying the remaining 61% of equity held by the five ANSP shareholders for approximately $366.7 million and taking on roughly $155 million in Aireon debt; the deal was set to close in early July 2026. Iridium also said it was studying additional hosted payloads for the next-generation Iridium constellation, including VHF aeronautical communications and positioning, navigation, and timing.

== Operational service ==
=== North Atlantic activation (2019) ===
On 27 March 2019, NATS and Nav Canada activated Aireon's space-based ADS-B service for live operational use in the Shanwick Oceanic Control, Gander and Santa Maria flight information regions, becoming the first ANSPs to manage transatlantic traffic using real-time satellite surveillance. Between 28 March and 31 August 2019, NATS reported receiving approximately 134 million ADS-B position reports, all within its 8-second target update rate and most within 2 to 3 seconds, with an average delivery latency to the controller of 0.19 seconds against a 2-second target.

=== Reduced separation minima ===
Live satellite surveillance allowed ICAO and the North Atlantic Systems Planning Group to authorise the Advanced Surveillance-Enhanced Procedural Separation (ASEPS) trial, which reduced longitudinal separation between ADS-B-equipped aircraft on the North Atlantic Tracks from 40 nmi (a 5-minute time-based standard) to as little as 14 nmi, and lateral separation from 23 nmi to 15–19 nmi. A joint NATS / Nav Canada safety analysis estimated that the new standards reduced overall flight-safety risk in the North Atlantic by approximately 76%.

NATS reported that flights re-cleared to more efficient cruise levels an average of 470 kg for a typical 3-hour ocean segment. By 2023 NATS estimated that the new separation regime was reducing UK-managed North Atlantic CO₂ emissions by approximately 45,000 tonnes per year and saving airlines about £19 million annually in fuel costs, compared with a 2018 baseline; an independent cost-benefit assessment by the consultancy Steer, commissioned by NATS as part of its regulatory reporting, found that the service returned approximately £2 in value for every £1 spent. A 2016 study by Karen Marais of Purdue University projected that worldwide deployment could prevent approximately 14.3 million tonnes of CO₂ emissions over the decade from 2020 to 2030 by enabling more efficient flight profiles in oceanic and remote airspace.

=== Other regions ===
Following the North Atlantic deployment, additional ANSPs contracted for Aireon data, including the Civil Aviation Authority of Singapore, Airservices Australia, the Civil Aviation Authority of Malaysia and the South African Civil Aviation Authority. In November 2020, the Federal Aviation Administration announced a partnership with Aireon, with L3Harris as prime contractor, to evaluate operational and analytical uses of space-based ADS-B data across the U.S. National Airspace System, including a Caribbean trial intended to supplement the Grand Turk Island radar coverage south of San Juan.

In Iceland, Isavia ANS began operational use of Aireon data in the upper-level southern sectors of the Reykjavík and Nuuk flight information regions in October 2020, and achieved coverage across the full 5.4 million km² of its airspace in April 2022. On 10 April 2025, Isavia extended Aireon use down to ground level across the same airspace, completing a four-step rollout begun in 2020. Roughly a quarter of all North Atlantic crossings pass through the area Isavia manages.

== Other operators ==
=== Spire Global ===
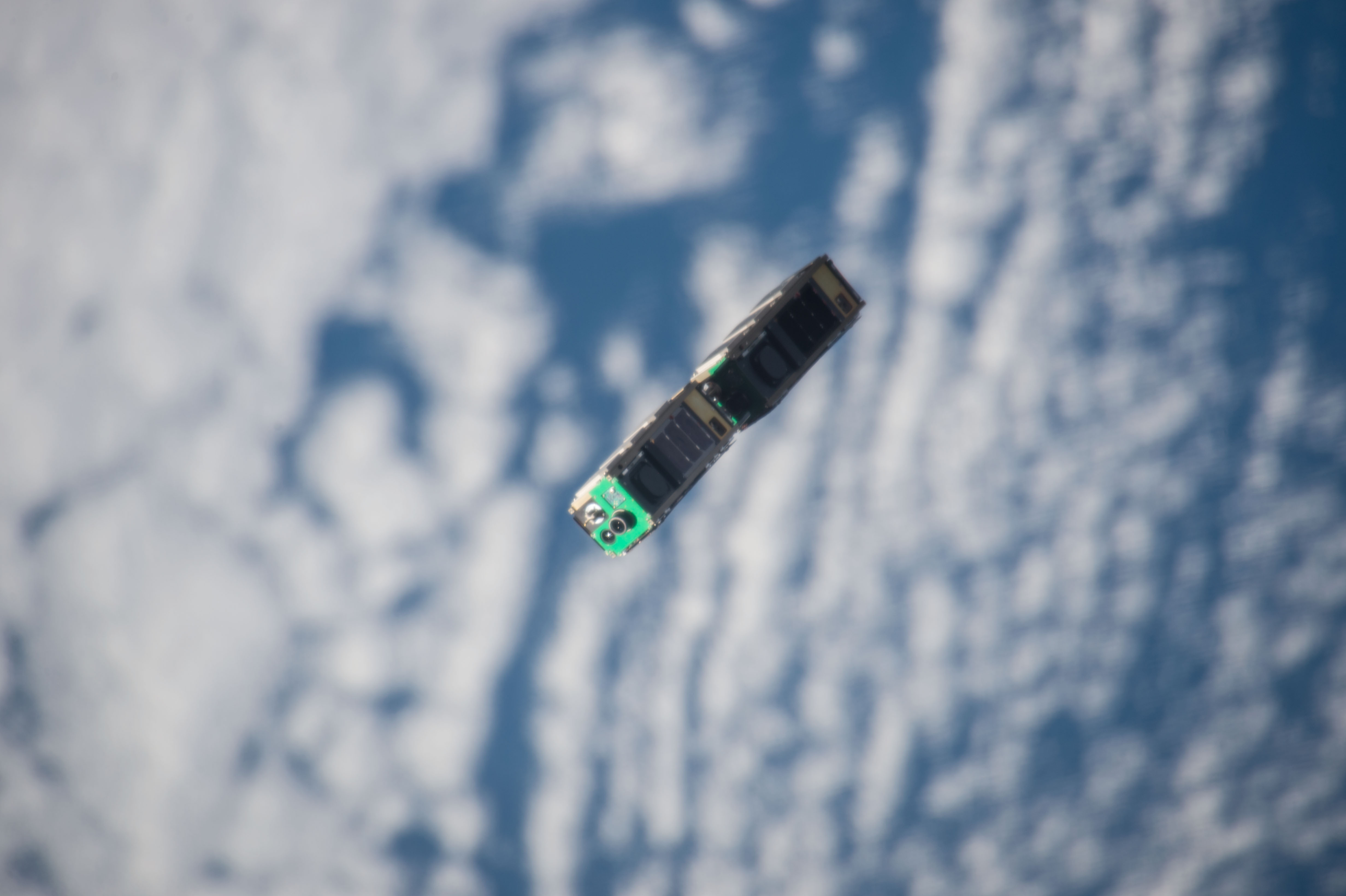
Spire Global Lemur-2 CubeSats being deployed from the International Space Station. Many Lemur-2 satellites carry ADS-B receivers for aircraft tracking.

Spire Global operates a commercial constellation of more than 100 3U CubeSats (Lemur-2), many of which carry ADS-B receivers alongside GNSS radio occultation and maritime AIS payloads. Spire markets its data through the AirSafe product line for aviation analytics, airline operations and air traffic management research; unlike Aireon, Spire's coverage is not continuous and the service is not certified for use as a primary ATC surveillance source.

=== Thales–Spire–ESSP (Eurialo) ===
In June 2024, Thales, Spire Global and the European Satellite Services Provider (ESSP) announced a memorandum of cooperation to develop a dedicated air-traffic-surveillance constellation of more than 100 satellites, with commercial service targeted for 2027 and a target latency of 1.5 seconds. The associated ESA-funded Eurialo programme, which received €16 million, aims to provide civil-aviation tracking independent of GNSS using radio-frequency signal-arrival timing.

== Applications ==
=== Search and rescue and aircraft tracking ===
Aireon has cited the 2014 disappearance of Malaysia Airlines Flight 370 as a motivation for global aircraft tracking, and offers position-history data to ANSPs and search-and-rescue agencies for use during distress and missing-aircraft events. The MH370 case also prompted ICAO to develop the Global Aeronautical Distress and Safety System (GADSS) standards for autonomous aircraft tracking. On 23 December 2019, satellite ADS-B data was used in the search for a Cessna P210 that ditched in international waters south of the Bahamas; the Aireon track showed the aircraft at zero feet above mean sea level after it left ground radar coverage, and a Coast Guard helicopter recovered the pilot within 55 metres of that satellite-derived position.

=== Accident investigation ===
Satellite ADS-B data has been used as evidence in major accident investigations. After the loss of Ethiopian Airlines Flight 302 on 10 March 2019, Aireon provided the National Transportation Safety Board, the Federal Aviation Administration and other European and African aviation authorities with the aircraft's altitude and position track captured from orbit, which extended beyond the range of ground stations near Addis Ababa. The FAA's acting administrator, Daniel Elwell, said the satellite-derived track of the Ethiopian flight closely resembled that of Lion Air Flight 610; Canada's Minister of Transport, Marc Garneau, cited the satellite tracking when joining more than fifty countries in the Boeing 737 MAX groundings.

=== Oceanic and remote-airspace surveillance ===
Beyond the North Atlantic, space-based ADS-B is used for surveillance of the North Pacific Tracks, South Atlantic, Indian Ocean and large parts of African upper airspace where radar deployment is impractical. ICAO has reviewed space-based ADS-B as a means of extending surveillance to oceanic, polar and remote-continental airspace previously outside continuous radio-based coverage.

== See also ==
- Flight tracking
