= Navigation paradox =

Phenomenon in aviation safety

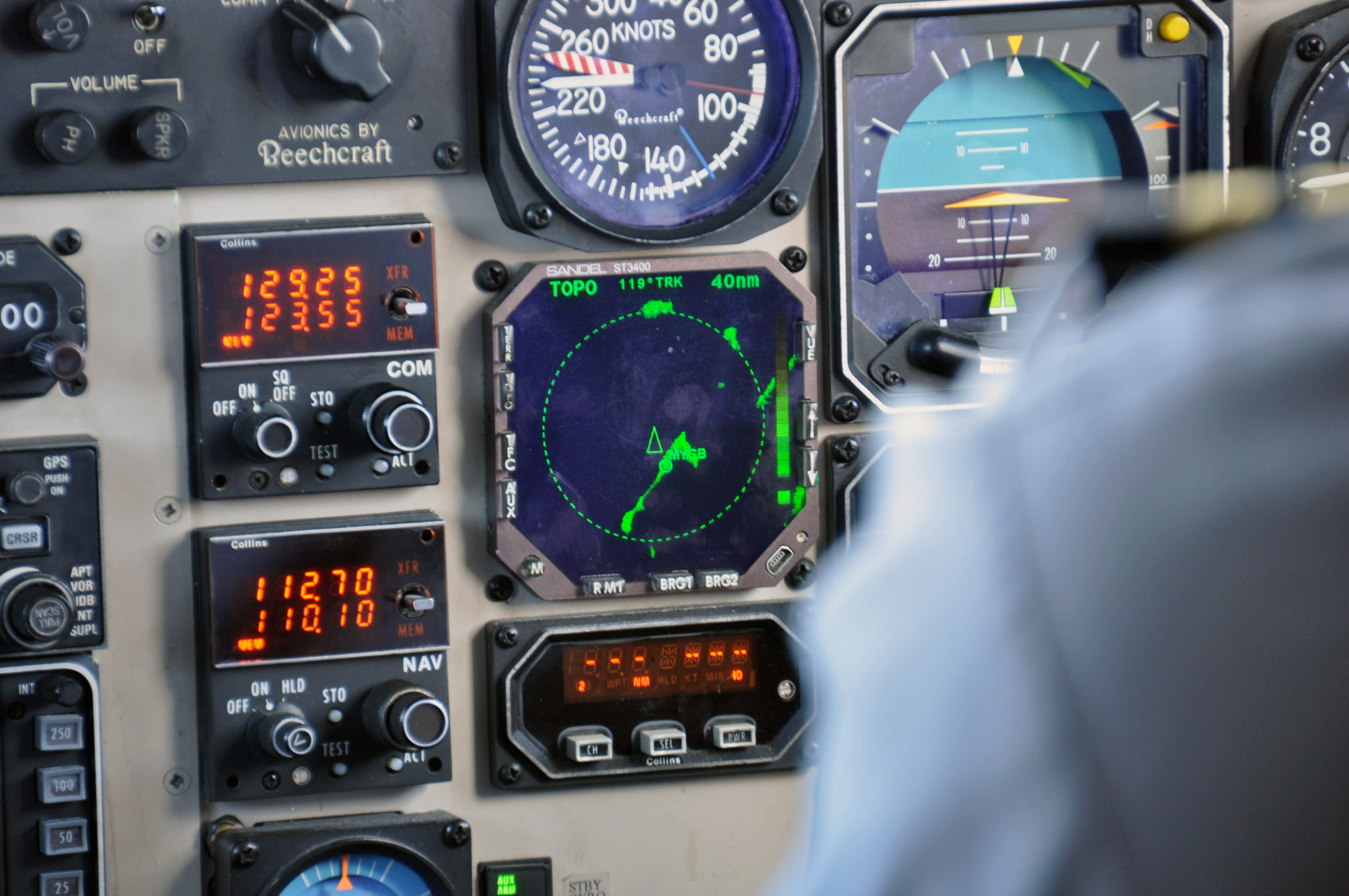
The control panel for a modern turboprop airplane.

The navigation paradox states that increased navigational precision may result in increased collision risk. In the case of ships and aircraft, the advent of Global Positioning System (GPS) navigation has enabled craft to follow navigational paths with such greater precision (often of the order of plus or minus 2 m), that, without better distribution of routes, coordination between neighboring craft and collision avoidance procedures, the likelihood of two craft occupying the same space on the shortest distance line between two navigational points has increased.

== Research ==
Robert E. Machol, an American engineer who worked with the FAA, attributes the term "navigation paradox" to Peter G. Reich, writing in 1964, and 1966, who recognized that "in some cases, increases in navigational precision increase collision risk". He further notes "that if vertical station-keeping is sloppy, then if longitudinal and lateral separation are lost, the planes will probably pass above and below each other. This is the ‘navigation paradox’ mentioned earlier."

Russ Paielli wrote a mid-air collision simulating computer model 500 mi^{2} (1,300 km^{2}) centered on Denver, Colorado. Paielli notes that aircraft cruising at random altitudes have five times fewer collisions than those obeying discrete cruising altitude rules, such as the internationally required hemispherical cruising altitude rules. At the same vertical error, the prototype linear cruising altitude rule tested produced 33.8 fewer mid-air collisions than the hemispherical cruising altitude rules.

The Altimeter-Compass Cruising Altitude Rule, attributed by Patlovany to "an uncredited Australian aviation safety pioneer" in 1928, proposes envisaging a north-up (i.e. fixed-rose) compass and an altimeter side-by-side; by selecting an altitude such that the large (100-ft) hand of the altimeter and the compass needle pointed in parallel, 100 feet of vertical separation would be provided for every 36 degrees of course offset. Aircraft would only share exactly the same altitude if they were flying exactly the same heading; and even in this event, they would have multiple altitudes at 360-foot intervals to choose from. Despite clear safety benefits in simulation, the ACCAR has not been widely adopted. In aircraft with modern heading indicators (in which the compass rose rotates under an indicator fixed in the 12 o'clock position), the rule is less easy to apply as the visual correlation is less intuitive.

Paielli's model, made in 2000, corroborated an earlier 1997 model by Patlovany showing that zero altitude error by pilots obeying the hemispherical cruising altitude rules resulted in six times more mid-air collisions than random cruising altitude. Similarly, Patlovany's computer model test of the Altimeter–Compass Cruising Altitude Rule (ACCAR) with zero piloting altitude error (a linear cruising altitude rule similar to the one recommended by Paielli), resulted in about 60% of the mid-air collisions counted from random altitude non compliance, or 10 times fewer collisions than the internationally accepted hemispherical cruising altitude rules. In other words, Patlovany's ACCAR alternative and Paielli's linear cruising altitude rule would reduce cruising midair collisions between 10 and 33 times, compared to the currently recognized, and internationally required, hemispherical cruising altitude rules, which institutionalize the navigation paradox on a worldwide basis.

The ACCAR alternative to the hemispherical cruising altitude rules, if adopted in 1997, could have eliminated the navigation paradox at all altitudes, and could have saved 342 lives in over 30 midair collisions (up to November 2006) since Patlovany's risk analysis proves that the current regulations increase the risk of a midair collision in direct proportion to pilot compliance. The Namibian collision in 1997, the Japanese near-miss in 2001, the Überlingen collision in Germany in 2002, and the Amazon collision in 2006, are all examples where human or hardware errors doomed altitude-accurate pilots killed by the navigation paradox designed into the current cruising altitude rules. The current system as described by Paielli noted as examples of other safety critical systems, nuclear power plants and elevators are designed to be passively safe and fault tolerant. The navigation paradox describes a midair collision safety system that by design cannot tolerate a single failure in human performance or electronic hardware.

To mitigate the described problem, many recommend, as legally allowed in very limited authorized airspace, that planes fly one or two miles offset from the center of the airway (to the right side) thus eliminating the problem only in the head-on collision scenario. The International Civil Aviation Organization's (ICAO) "Procedures for Air Navigation – Air Traffic Management Manual," authorizes lateral offset only in oceanic and remote airspace worldwide. However, this workaround for the particular case of a head-on collision threat on a common assigned airway fails to address the navigation paradox in general, and it fails to specifically address the inherent system safety fault intolerance inadvertently designed into international air traffic safety regulations.^{[4]} To be specific, in the cases of intersecting flight paths where either aircraft is not on an airway (for example, flying under a "direct" clearance, or a temporary diversion clearance for weather threats), or where intersecting aircraft flights are on deliberately intersecting airways, these more general threats receive no protection from flying one or two miles to the right of the center of the airway. Intersecting flight paths must still intersect somewhere.

As with the midair collision over Germany, an offset to the right of an airway would have simply changed the impact point by a mile or two away from where the intersection actually did occur. Of the 342 deaths since 1997 so far caused by the lack of a linear cruising altitude rule (like ACCAR), only the head-on collision over the Amazon could have been prevented if either pilot had been flying an offset to the right of the airway centerline. In contrast, ACCAR systematically separates conflicting traffic in all airspace at all altitudes on any heading, whether over the middle of the ocean or over high-density multinational-interface continental airspace. Nothing about the Reduced Vertical Separation Minima (RVSM) system design addresses the inherent vulnerability of the air traffic system to expected faults in hardware and human performance, as experienced in the Namibian, German, Amazon and Japanese accidents.^{[5]}

== See also ==
- Air traffic control
- Air traffic controller
- Gol Transportes Aéreos Flight 1907
- Law of unintended consequences
