= Reduced lateral separation minima =

Reduced Lateral Separation Minima (RLAT or RLatSM), is an aeronautical flight term identifying the reduction from standard lateral separation minima between aircraft to a lower amount deemed safe, first introduced on the North Atlantic in December 2015 for the North Atlantic Tracks.

== History ==
Beginning in 1961, the North Atlantic Organised Track System (NAT-OTS) was created, wherein specific routes were defined daily in order for pilots to safely and efficiently fly across the North Atlantic between Europe and America. The first officially published tracks appeared in 1965, and later on similar track systems evolved in other high-traffic areas such as the Pacific Organised Track System. However, as demand increased in the North Atlantic airline market, traffic increased to such a point that a way to increase traffic flow had to be found. The forerunner of RLAT/RLatSM, RVSM - Reduced Vertical Separation Minima - first introduced in 1997, reduced the standard altitude spacing between aircraft from 2,000 feet to 1,000 feet. RVSM allowed more aircraft to operate on the same route, thereby improving fuel efficiency and performance.

However, even RVSM was soon not enough to cope with the increased traffic. On the North Atlantic the concept of reducing the standard lateral separation was discussed at NAT SPG (North Atlantic Systems Planning Group) meetings as far back as the 1960s. The successful implementation of RVSM and also a Reduced Longitudinal Separation (RLong) program, separating planes on the same track based on time, allowed progress on the RLAT issue.

== Implementation and design ==
RLAT was introduced on a trial basis on 12 November 2015, with the first tracks published on 13 December 2015. RLAT provides for more tracks within the same airspace by adding more tracks and reducing separation. the new tracks are known as 'half -tracks', which reduce separation from one degree of latitude (60 nm) to 25 nm. 24 new Oceanic Entry Points (OEPs) were added, as well as a few procedural changes. These will affect all operators on the North Atlantic. RLAT Tracks are implemented at Flight levels FL350 to FL390 only, as opposed to the current tracks which are available between FL290-410. The first phase of the trial only allowed for three daily half tracks. Phase two of the trial came into effect in January 2018, 20 months behind schedule, with one more extra half track and more tracks to be implemented over time.

After March 28, 2018, ICAO combined the Rlat and RLong program into one- the Performance Based Communication and Surveillance (PBCS). This means that there are some tracks, now known as PBCS tracks or half tracks, where RLat and RLong are both applied. A transition period of six months was provided for users to adapt to the system.

== Aircraft requirements ==
Since the RLAT Tracks will always be within NAT HLA (High Level Airspace), operators must meet the existing basic HLA requirements, and the additional RLAT requirements. Existing requirements for HLA include:

- HF Radio
- RNP4 or RNP10

To use PBCS Tracks:

- CPDLC comms, with RCP240 compliance
- RNP4 or above
- ADS-C, with RSP180 compliance

This allows FANS equipped aircraft to use PBCS tracks. There are no changes to the in flight contingency procedures and weather deviation procedures as detailed in PANS ATM Doc444 Para15.2 & 15.2.3. SLOP procedures are also unchanged.
