= H.R. 3578 (113th Congress) =

- Long title: To ensure that any new or revised requirement providing for the screening, testing, or treatment of an airman or an air traffic controller for a sleep disorder is adopted pursuant to a rulemaking proceeding, and for other purposes.
- Announced in: the 113th United States Congress
- Sponsored by: Rep. Frank A. LoBiondo (R, NJ-2)
- Number of co-sponsors: 5

Codification
- U.S.C. sections affected: 49 U.S.C. § 40102, 5 U.S.C. § 2109
- Agencies affected: United States Department of Transportation

Legislative history
- Introduced in the House as H.R. 3578 by Rep. Frank A. LoBiondo (R, NJ-2) on November 21, 2013; Committee consideration by United States House Committee on Transportation and Infrastructure

The bill H.R. 3578 had the long title "To ensure that any new or revised requirement providing for the screening, testing, or treatment of an airman or an air traffic controller for a sleep disorder is adopted pursuant to a rulemaking proceeding, and for other purposes." It is a bill that would require that "any federal rules on testing of air traffic controllers for sleep disorders are issued under a formal rulemaking process."

The bill was introduced into the United States House of Representatives during the 113th United States Congress.

== Background ==
Air traffic controllers are people trained to maintain the safe, orderly and expeditious flow of air traffic in the global air traffic control system. The primary purpose of Air traffic control worldwide is to prevent collisions, organize and expedite the flow of traffic, and provide information and other support for pilots. In the United States, air traffic controllers are responsible for directing the flight paths of more than 60 million planes a year. The position of air traffic controller is one that requires highly specialized knowledge, skills, and abilities. Controllers apply separation rules to keep aircraft at a safe distance from each other in their area of responsibility and move all aircraft safely and efficiently through their assigned sector of airspace, as well as on the ground. Because controllers have an incredibly large responsibility while on duty (often in aviation, "on position") and make countless split-second decisions on a daily basis, the ATC profession is consistently regarded around the world as one of the most mentally challenging careers, and can be notoriously stressful depending on many variables (equipment, configurations, weather, traffic volume, human factors, etc.). Many controllers, however, would cite high salaries and a very large, unique, and privileged degree of autonomy as major advantages of their jobs. There are approximately 15,000 air traffic controllers in the United States.

A sleep disorder, or somnipathy, is a medical disorder of the sleep patterns of a person or animal. Some sleep disorders are serious enough to interfere with normal physical, mental and emotional functioning. Polysomnography is a test commonly ordered for some sleep disorders.

== Provisions of the bill ==
This summary is based largely on the summary provided by the Congressional Research Service, a public domain source.

H.R. 3578 would authorize the Secretary of Transportation (DOT) to implement or enforce a requirement providing for the screening, testing, or treatment of airmen or air traffic controllers for sleep disorders (including obstructive sleep apnea) only if it is adopted pursuant to a rulemaking proceeding.

The bill would apply this Act only to a requirement adopted on or after November 1, 2013.

== Congressional Budget Office report ==
This summary is based largely on the summary provided by the Congressional Budget Office, as ordered reported by the House Committee on Transportation and Infrastructure on December 4, 2013. This is a public domain source.

H.R. 3578 would require the Secretary of Transportation to follow formal rulemaking procedures when establishing new requirements for certain types of medical tests for pilots and air traffic controllers. The Congressional Budget Office (CBO) estimates that enacting H.R. 3578 would have no significant impact on the federal budget.

Based on information from the Federal Aviation Administration, the CBO estimates that any federal spending to pursue required rulemakings under the bill would not exceed $500,000 in any given year or over five years. Such spending would be subject to the availability of appropriated funds. Enacting H.R. 3578 would not affect direct spending or revenues; therefore, pay-as-you-go procedures do not apply.

H.R. 3578 contains no intergovernmental or private-sector mandates as defined in the Unfunded Mandates Reform Act and would not affect the budgets of state, local, or tribal governments.

== Procedural history ==
H.R. 3578 was introduced into the United States House of Representatives on November 21, 2013 by Rep. Frank A. LoBiondo (R, NJ-2). It was referred to the United States House Committee on Transportation and Infrastructure. On February 7, 2014, House Majority Leader Eric Cantor announced that H.R. 3578 would be on the House schedule for February 11 or 12th, 2014, to be considered under a suspension of the rules.

== See also ==
- List of bills in the 113th United States Congress
- aircraft
- Air traffic control
- Sleep disorder
