= Siberian Express =

Meteorological term in the United States

Siberian Express is a meteorological term in the United States describing the arrival of an extremely cold air mass of Siberian origins. It specifically refers to an origin in Siberia. The term is most commonly employed by the news media when such a frigid air mass moves into the northern plains or upper Midwest. Meteorologically, it is typically associated with a phenomenon called the Pacific–North American teleconnection pattern (PNA).

"Siberian Express" was the nickname coined by a meteorologist to describe the January 17, 1982 cold wave event hitting much of the United States. Also called "Cold Sunday", the event broke many all-time record lows.

Paleoclimatologist Jack A. Wolfe published in 1992 about the geographic origin. The frozen Arctic Ocean produced the frigid air for the "Siberian Express", the high-pressure system in Siberia which was southward blocked by the Himalayas and Tibetan Plateau, that transported the air down into North America.

== See also ==
- Siberian High
- Cold wave
- Cold front
- Pineapple Express
- Pacific Organized Track System
