= 1997 Namibia mid-air collision =

Collision between USAF C-141B and German Air Force Tu-154M

Accident
- Date: 13 September 1997
- Summary: Mid-air collision due to pilot error on the TU-154M aircraft and Air Traffic Control fault, loss of separation
- Site: 65 nmi (120 km) west of Namibia; 18°30′S 11°03′E
- Total fatalities: 33

First aircraft
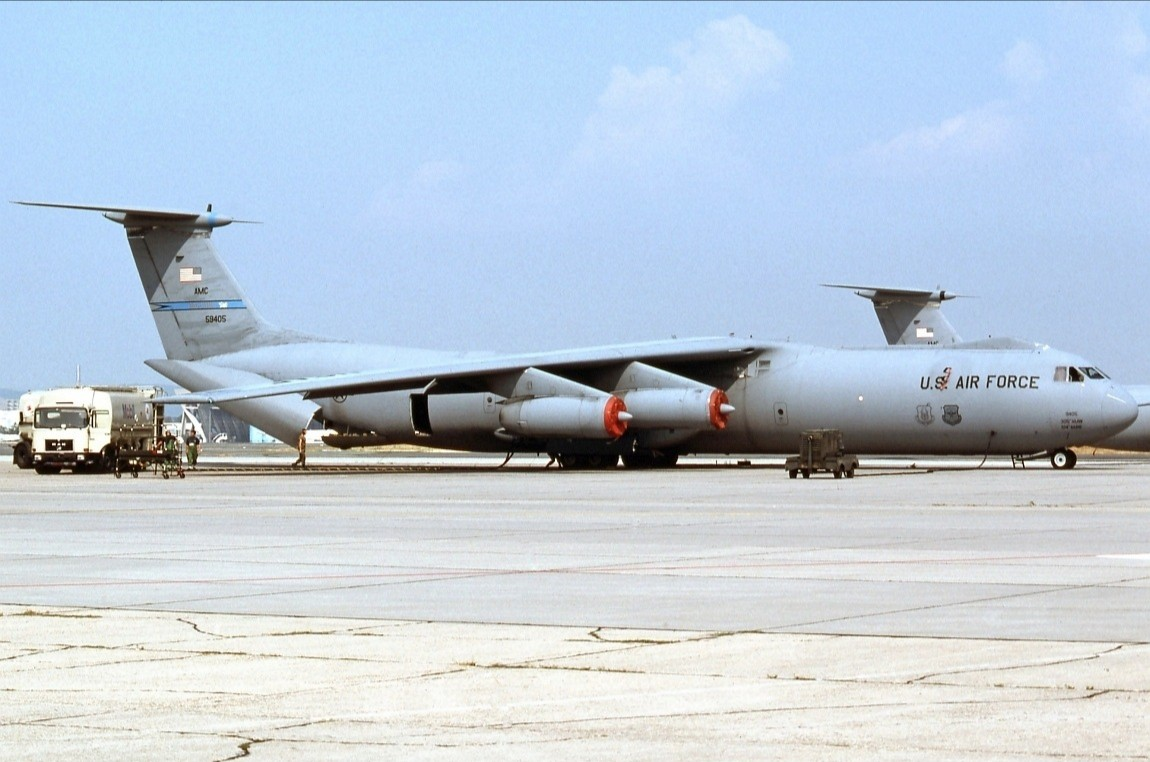
- 65-9405, the C-141B involved in the accident, seen in 1995
- Type: Lockheed C-141B Starlifter
- Operator: United States Air Force
- Call sign: REACH 4201
- Registration: 65-9405
- Flight origin: Hosea Kutako International Airport (WDH/FYWE), Windhoek, Namibia
- Destination: Georgetown-Wideawake Field, Ascension Island
- Occupants: 9
- Passengers: 0
- Crew: 9
- Fatalities: 9
- Survivors: 0

Second aircraft
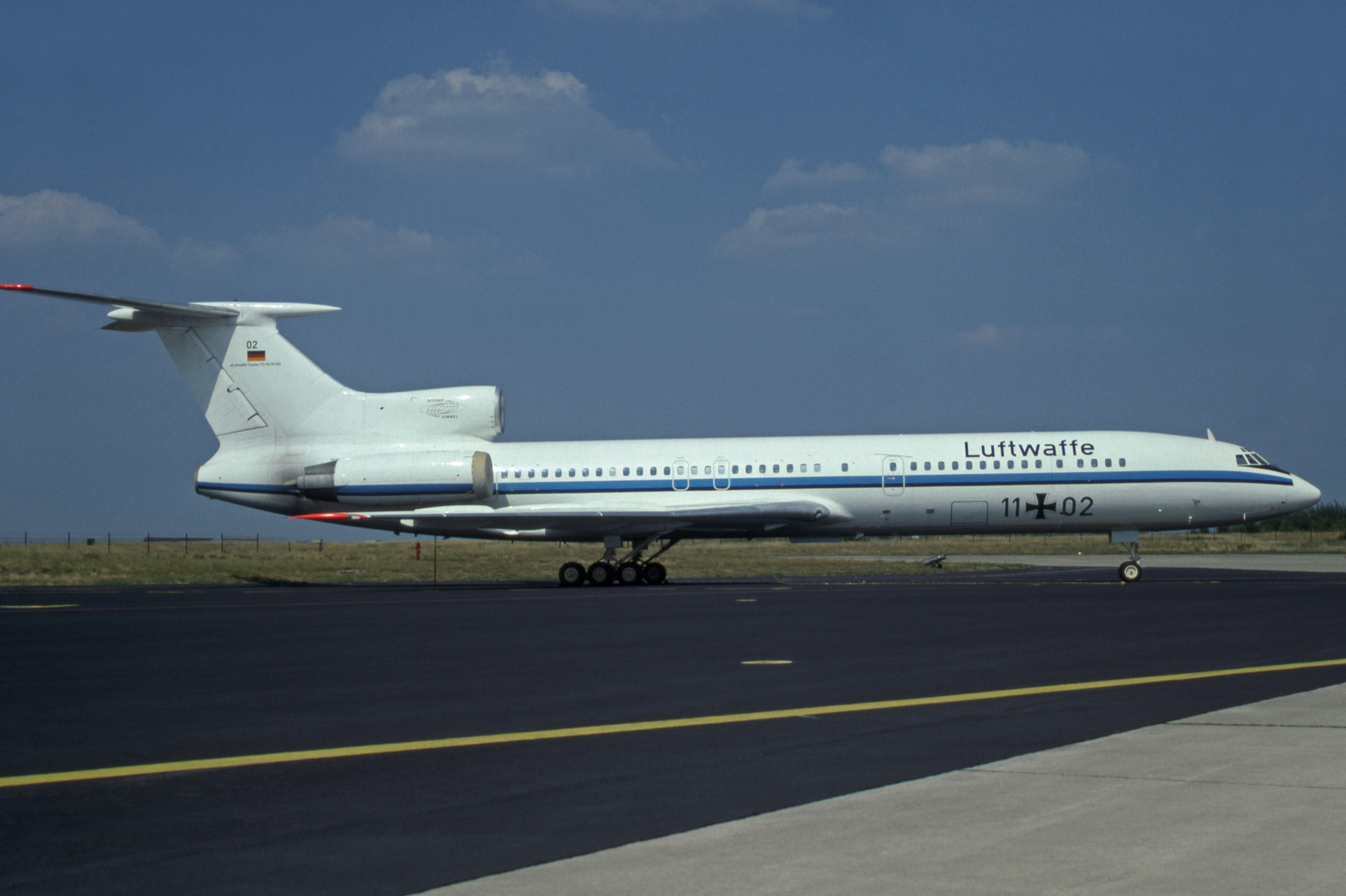
- 11+02, the Tu-154M involved in the accident
- Type: Tupolev Tu-154M
- Operator: German Air Force
- Call sign: GAF 074
- Registration: 11+02
- Flight origin: Niamey Airport (NIM/DRRN), Niger
- Destination: Cape Town International Airport, South Africa
- Occupants: 24
- Passengers: 14
- Crew: 10
- Fatalities: 24
- Survivors: 0

On 13 September 1997, a German Air Force Tupolev Tu-154M Open Skies observation aircraft and a United States Air Force Lockheed C-141B Starlifter transport aircraft struck each other mid-air while cruising at 35,000 feet (10.67 km) off the coast of Namibia. As a result of the crash, all 33 people on board both aircraft were killed and both aircraft were destroyed. At the time of the collision, the Tupolev was flying on a southbound route from Niamey, Niger, to Cape Town, South Africa, while the C-141 was heading northbound from Windhoek, Namibia, to Ascension Island.

Neither aircraft was equipped with a TCAS system, and although both crews had filed a flight plan, the German aircraft was not in contact with Namibian air traffic control at the time of the collision and controllers were unaware of its presence in Namibian airspace. Furthermore, the Tupolev was flying at the wrong altitude, according to its flight plan and to the semicircular rule which requires 33,000 feet (10.06 km) or 37,000 feet (11.28 km).

The subsequent US Air Force inquiry concluded that the German crew was responsible for the accident, citing pilot error and inadequate air traffic control that contributed to the fatal lack of separation.

A year before the accident, the International Federation of Airline Pilots' Associations had stated that from a safety point of view, 75 percent of African airspace was "critically deficient."

== Aircraft and crew ==
The Lockheed C-141 Starlifter that was involved in the accident was a four-engine, strategic airlifter in service with the US Air Force. The example involved in the accident, a C-141B variant, tail number 65-9405, was assigned to the 305th Air Mobility Wing based at McGuire Air Force Base, New Jersey. At the time it was conducting a humanitarian flight to Namibia, delivering a mine-clearing team for the United Nations.

The aircraft, using the callsign REACH 4201, was under the command of Captain Peter Vallejo, 34, with Captain Jason Ramsey, 27, and Captain Gregory M. Cindrich, 31, acting as pilots. Six other personnel were on board as well, including a crew chief, two flight engineers, and two loadmasters.

The Tupolev Tu-154M involved, tail number 11+02, was one of two in the Luftwaffe inventory, both inherited from the East German Air Force along with crew members. Assigned to 1 Staffel/Flugbereitschaft, it had previously been used for verification purposes under the Open Skies Treaty. As such it was equipped with cameras and sensors in the fuselage. The aircraft was crewed by a complement of 10 and was flying 14 passengers, which included 12 German marines and two of their spouses from Cologne, Germany, to Cape Town, South Africa, for a regatta celebrating the 75th anniversary of the South African Navy. The pilots, both experienced, were Ralph Reinhold and Klaus Ehrlichmann. Flying under the callsign GAF 074, the aircraft had made a stopover in Niamey, Niger and was due to land in Windhoek, Namibia for another refueling stop before continuing on to Cape Town.

== Flight and collision ==
=== Flight paths ===
Map of Namibia showing the estimated location of the collision

The Luftwaffe Tu-154M departed Cologne, Germany, on 13 September 1997 and landed in Niamey, Niger, to refuel. While in Niger, the crew filed a flight plan requesting a cruise altitude of 35,000 feet with an en route climb to 39,000 feet. At 10:35 UTC, GAF 074 departed Niamey and began flying on a southerly track. While flying through Gabonese airspace, GAF 074 received a slight reroute. The aircraft changed altitude as it passed western Africa and turned in an easterly direction, in compliance with airway requirements.

At 14:11 UTC, the United States Air Force C-141B departed from Windhoek, Namibia, for Ascension Island, a British territory in the South Atlantic. Per REACH 4201's filed flight plan it was flying on a northwesterly track at a cruise altitude of 35,000 feet. Visual meteorological conditions prevailed at the time of the aircraft's departure.

=== Air traffic control ===
In 1996, the International Federation of Airline Pilots' Associations (IFAPA) labeled 75% of African airspace as "critically deficient." due to safety concerns and poor air traffic control service. The situation was so severe that in the same year, South African airline pilots reported more than 70 near-misses while flying in the African continent.

The C-141B was under the control of Namibian air traffic control upon taking off from Windhoek. Namibian controllers had not received a flight plan or a departure signal from the Tu-154M and were not aware that the German aircraft had entered its flight information region. The last agency to have contact with the German aircraft was Accra air traffic control. Air traffic control authorities in Luanda, Angola, had not contacted Namibian controllers to inform them of the aircraft's presence as required under ICAO regulations. The Tu-154M had changed altitude during its flight without the controllers' knowledge. Contributing to the communications breakdowns, the Aeronautical Fixed Telecommunication Network, a system that facilitates the exchange of messages between air controllers was not working at the time. The air traffic control center in Windhoek received the last communication from the C-141B crew via high-frequency radio, who stated they were level at 35,000 feet.

=== Collision ===
At 15:10 hours UTC, 65 nautical miles (120 kilometres) off the coast of Namibia, the two aircraft collided. The Tu-154M struck the C-141B in the lower fuselage, causing an explosion that was observed as a bright flash by a US surveillance satellite overflying the area. Cockpit voice recordings show that at least one crew member in the Tu-154M noticed the C-141B and had attempted to maneuver away, unsuccessfully. A transcript from the CVR shows that the American crew were not killed on impact. One of the pilots can be heard saying, "oxygen mask, get them on, get them on. Get the flashlights quick." In addition, a nearby French Air Force aircraft reported that it picked up one "mayday" distress call. Both aircraft crashed into the sea, ultimately killing all 33 passengers and crew aboard both airplanes.

== Search and recovery ==
ATC authorities in Ascension Island attempted fifty times to contact aviation authorities in Namibia when the C-141B did not arrive as scheduled. At 10:55 UTC the following day, Ascension ATC contacted Air Mobility Command and notified them of the overdue aircraft. At 11:00 UTC, the aircraft was declared missing. An international search effort by the United States, France, Great Britain, Germany, and several African countries ensued, scouring the seas off Namibia for any signs of wreckage. A French aircraft flying over the apparent crash site picked up a faint signal from one of the aircraft's emergency beacons. The South African Air Force stated it had received a signal from a life jacket emergency beacon, raising the hope of finding survivors. A mid-air collision was presumed to be the most likely scenario since both aircraft had gone missing at the same time in virtually the same location. The first pieces of wreckage were found by a search ship on 16 September. Six days after the crash, authorities announced they had found the body of 43 year old German flight attendant Saskia Neumeyer, the first body to be recovered.

By December 1997, very few remnants of the crash had been discovered. The body of Saskia Neumeyer had been the only one of the 33 missing passengers and crew to be recovered and very little of the wreckage had been found. A fishing trawler discovered several pieces of clothing on 13 December from a depth of 655 meters. The remains of Captain Peter Vallejo and Captain Jason Ramsey were located by divers later in December 1997 along with unidentifiable skeletal remains of other crew members. They were buried on 2 April 1998 in Arlington National Cemetery.

== Investigation and aftermath ==
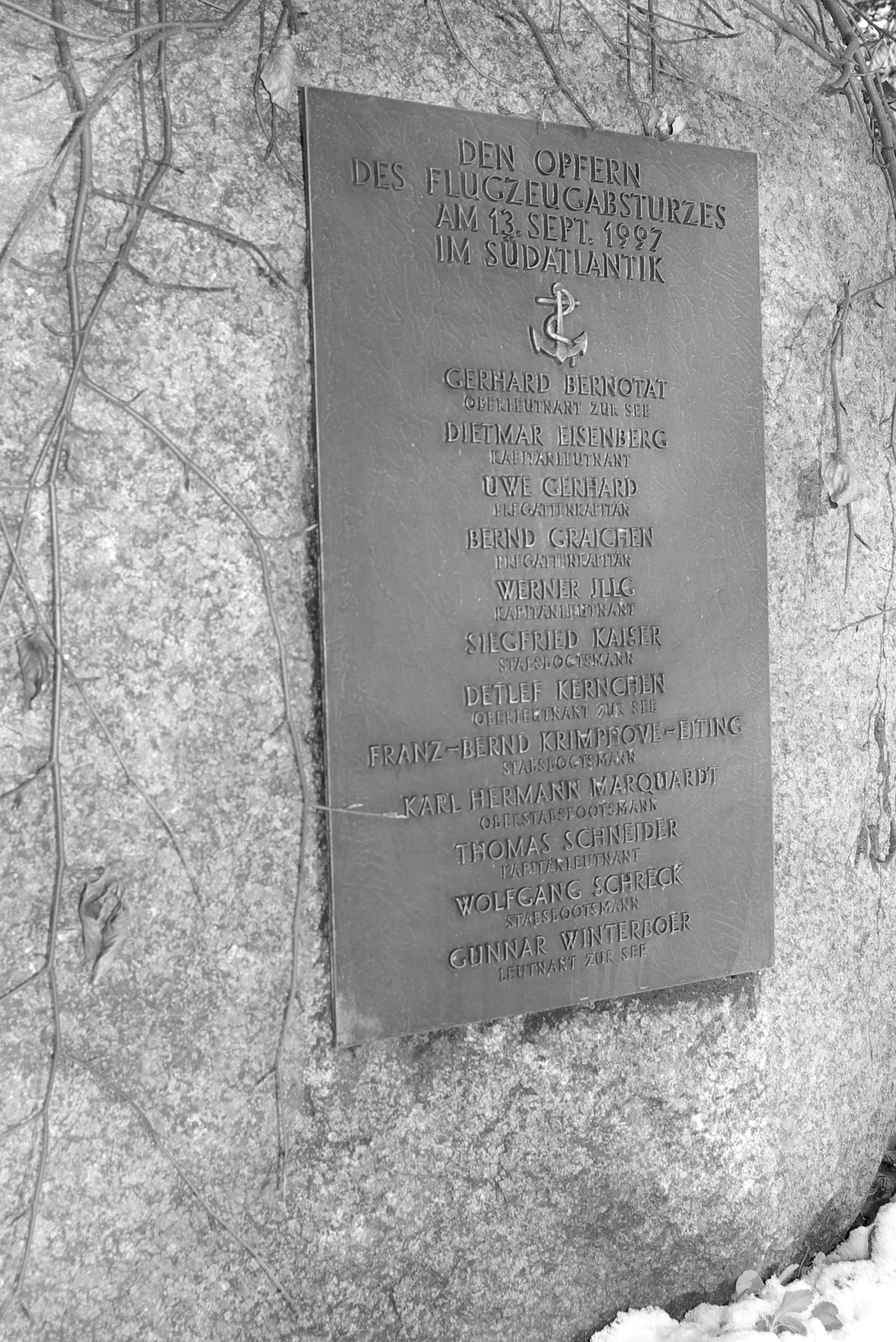
Memorial plaque to the passengers of the Luftwaffe Tu-154M

In 1997, the United States Air Force appointed Colonel William H. C. Schell Jr. to lead the investigation into the collision. A final report with the board's conclusions was released in March 1998. The investigation blamed primarily the German crew, who were cruising at 35,000 feet in breach of the semicircular rule, which states that an aircraft heading in a southeasterly direction must fly at an altitude of either 29,000, 33,000, 37,000 or 41,000 feet (8,800, 10,100, 11,300 or 12,500 m). The Luftwaffe also acknowledged that its aircraft was at fault in the crash in its own investigative report.

In addition the report cited systemic problems in Africa's air traffic control system as contributing factors to the accident, blaming faulty communications equipment that prevented the German aircraft's flight plan from being transmitted through the proper channels and negligent controllers in Luanda who failed to pass on the aircraft's position to Namibian ATC. Another substantially contributing factor was the complicated and sporadic operation of the Aeronautical Fixed Telecommunications Network (AFTN).

The report stated that if either aircraft had been equipped with a TCAS it is highly likely the crash could have been avoided, reading, "the presence of a fully operational TCAS on either aircraft could have prevented the accident." One day before the release of the report, Secretary of Defense William S. Cohen announced that the military would begin the installation of TCAS on its aircraft.

The lack of a TCAS on the German aircraft brought considerable pressure on Germany's Federal Ministry of Defence to install collision avoidance systems on its aircraft. Despite being listed on the Project Objective Memorandum of the C-141B for five years, installation of the TCAS began on a small number of the aircraft soon after the crash.
