= Strategic lateral offset procedure =

Aircraft navigation procedure

Increased navigational accuracy can place several aircraft on the same course in the same lateral position

Strategic lateral offset procedure (SLOP) is a solution to a byproduct of increased navigation accuracy in aircraft. Because most now use GPS, aircraft track flight routes with extremely high accuracy. As a result, if an error in height occurs, there is a much higher chance of collision. SLOP allows aircraft to offset the centreline of an airway or flight route by a small amount, normally to the right, so that collision with opposite direction aircraft becomes unlikely.

In the North Atlantic Region pilots are expected to fly along the oceanic track center-line or 1 or 2 nautical miles to its right, randomly choosing one of these three offsets on each entry to oceanic airspace. The aim is to not achieve an overall even distribution of one-third of all flights on each of the three possible tracks, as one might assume. When the procedure was originally developed, 4.9 percent of aircraft in most oceans could not offset automatically, so the centerline had to remain as an option. Because of the possibility of opposite direction traffic on the centerline, it is the least desirable option, with the highest risk. The procedure lowers the overall risk of collision should an aircraft move vertically away from its assigned level. This randomization has the advantage over a planned assignment of offsets to each individual aircraft in that it mitigates the collision hazard for same-direction flights should an aircraft be erroneously flown along a track that was not assigned by ATC.

SLOP is recommended for use in modern flight management system-based, RVSM (reduced vertical separation minima)-equipped aircraft operations to mitigate the midair collision hazard, which is amplified by the accuracy of modern aircraft navigational technology and onboard flight instruments.

Lateral navigation (left–right) based on global positioning system (GPS), and RVSM quality altimetry (up–down), are each so accurate in their own dimension that opposite-direction aircraft which are erroneously flying the same altitude on the same navigational path are very likely to collide.

In addition to mitigating en route midair collision hazard, SLOP is used to reduce the probability of high-altitude wake turbulence encounters. During periods of low wind velocity aloft, aircraft which are spaced 1000 feet vertically but pass directly overhead in opposite directions can generate wake turbulence which may cause either injury to passengers/crew or undue structural airframe stress. This hazard is an unintended consequence of RVSM vertical spacing reductions which are designed to increase allowable air traffic density. Rates of closure for typical jet aircraft at cruise speed routinely exceed 900 knots.

Wake turbulence is thought likely to be experienced by the lower of two aircraft when it arrives approximately 15–30 nm behind an opposite-direction aircraft which has crossed directly overhead on the same route. On 13 November 2015, ICAO published a revised version of Document 4444, Pans ATM Paragraph 16.5 that includes provisions for applying SLOP in a continental/domestic air space for aircraft that are capable of offsetting in tenths of a mile. Centerline is not an option as aircraft can offset up to one-half mile right of course, in tenths of a mile, providing 5 alternative offsets.

In January 2017, the ICAO SPG (Authority for the NAT region) published updated guidance indicating that SLOP is now a requirement on the North Atlantic, rather than a recommendation. The guidance was part of a number of changes that were contained in a revised 2017 edition of NAT Doc 007:North Atlantic Airspace and Operations Manual.

== See also ==
- Navigation paradox
- NAT-OTS
- RLSM
