= Pineapple Express =

Meteorological phenomenon

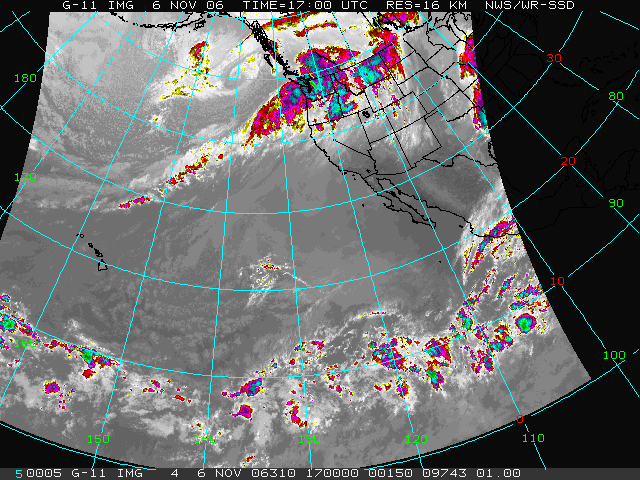
November 2006 satellite image showing clouds from north of Hawaii to Washington, a Pineapple Express configuration

Pineapple Express is a specific recurring atmospheric river both in the waters immediately northeast of the Hawaiian Islands and extending northeast to any location along the Pacific coast of North America. It is a non-technical term for a meteorological phenomenon. It is characterized by a strong and persistent large-scale flow of warm moist air, and the associated heavy precipitation. A Pineapple Express is an example of an atmospheric river, which is a more general term for such relatively narrow corridors of enhanced water vapor transport at mid-latitudes around the world.

== Causes and effects ==
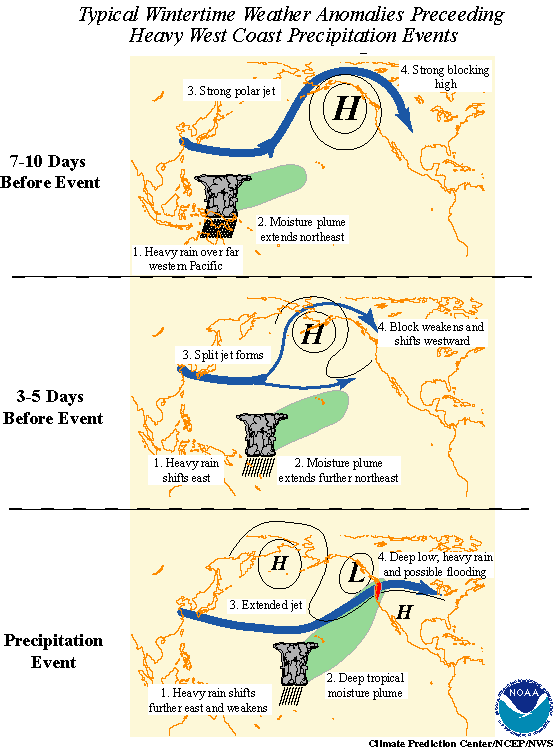
How the Madden–Julian oscillation can induce a Pineapple Express

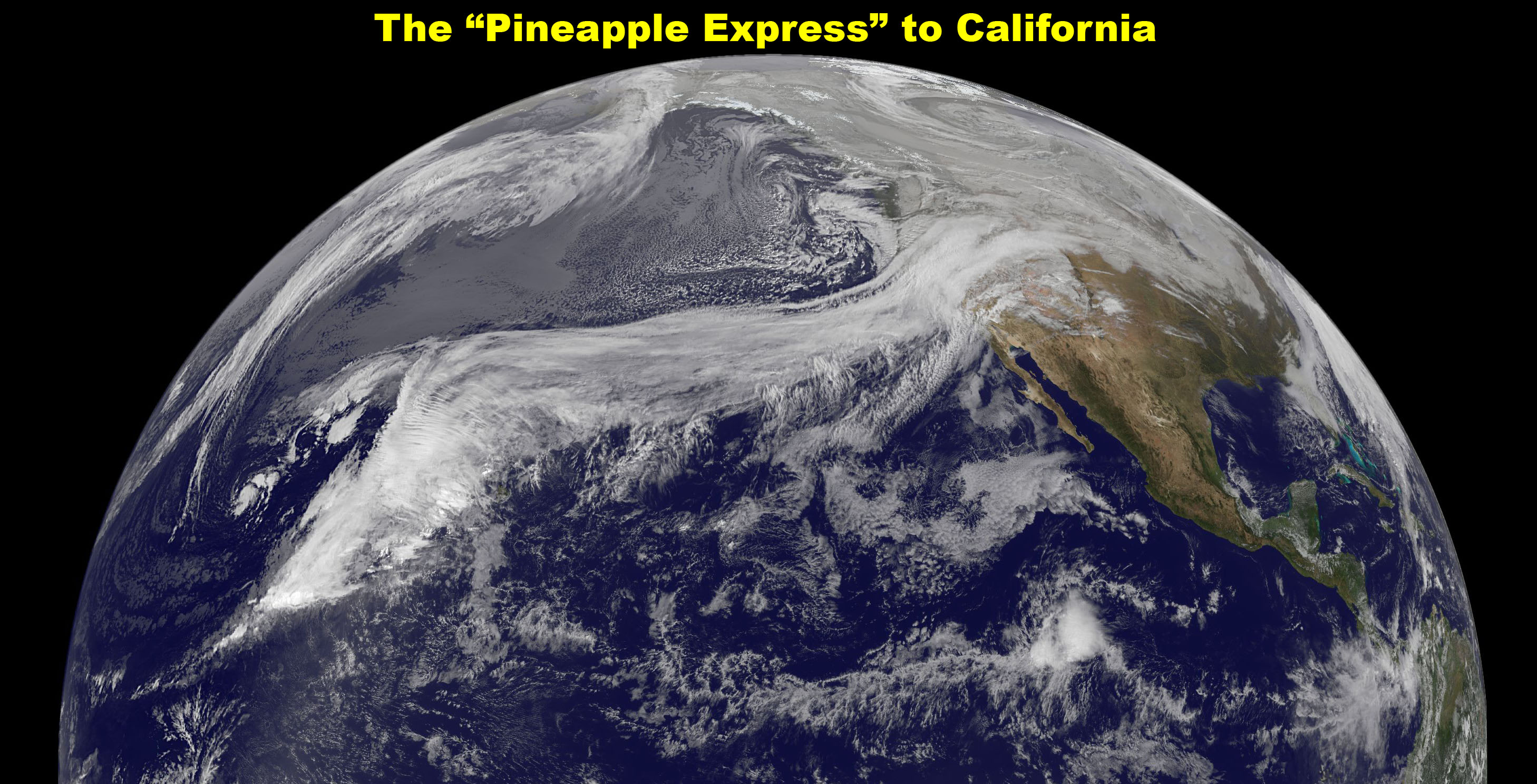
NASA Geostationary Operational Environmental Satellite called GOES-11, image of the "Pineapple Express" captured at 1800 UTC (1 p.m. EST) on 19 December 2010. Subtropical Storm Omeka can be seen on the left side of the image.

A Pineapple Express is driven by a strong, southern branch of the polar jet stream and is marked by the presence of a surface frontal boundary which is typically either slow or stationary, with waves of low pressure traveling along its length. Each of these low-pressure systems brings enhanced rainfall.

The conditions are often created by the Madden–Julian oscillation, an equatorial rainfall pattern which feeds its moisture into this pattern. They are also present during an El Niño episode.

The combination of moisture-laden air, atmospheric dynamics, and orographic enhancement resulting from the passage of this air over the mountain ranges of the western coast of North America causes some of the most torrential rains to occur in the region. Pineapple Express systems typically generate heavy snowfall in the mountains and Interior Plateau, which often melts rapidly because of the warming effect of the system. After being drained of their moisture, the tropical air masses reach the inland prairies as a Chinook wind or simply "a Chinook", a term which is also synonymous in the Pacific Northwest with the Pineapple Express.

== Extreme cases ==
Many Pineapple Express events follow or occur simultaneously with major arctic troughs in the northwestern United States, often leading to major snow-melt flooding with warm, tropical rains falling on frozen, snow laden ground. Examples of this are the Christmas flood of 1964, Willamette Valley flood of 1996, New Year's Day Flood of 1997, January 2006 Flood in Northern California and Nevada, Great Coastal Gale of 2007, January 2008 Flood in Nevada, January 2009 Flood in Washington, the January 2012 Flood in Oregon, the 2019 Valentine's Day Flood in Southern California, and the February 2020 floods in Oregon and Washington.

=== West coast, 1862 ===
Early in 1862, extreme storms riding the Pineapple Express battered the west coast for 45 days. In addition to a sudden snow melt, some places received an estimated 8.5 feet (2,600 mm) of rain, leading to the worst flooding in recorded history of California, Oregon, and Nevada, known as the Great Flood of 1862. Both the Sacramento and San Joaquin valleys flooded, and there was extensive flooding and mudslides throughout the region.

=== Northern California, 1952 ===
The San Francisco Bay Area is another locale along the Pacific Coast which is occasionally affected by a Pineapple Express. When it visits, the heavy, persistent rainfall typically causes flooding of local streams as well as urban flooding. In the decades before about 1980, the local term for a Pineapple Express was "Hawaiian Storm". During the second week of January 1952, a series of "Hawaiian" storms swept into Northern California, causing widespread flooding around the Bay Area.

The same storms brought a blizzard of heavy, wet snow to the Sierra Nevada Mountains, notoriously stranding the train City of San Francisco on 13 January.

=== Northern California, 1955 ===
The greatest flooding in Northern California since the 1800s occurred in 1955 as a result of a series of Hawaiian storms, with the greatest damage in the Sacramento Valley around Yuba City.

=== Southern California, 2005 ===
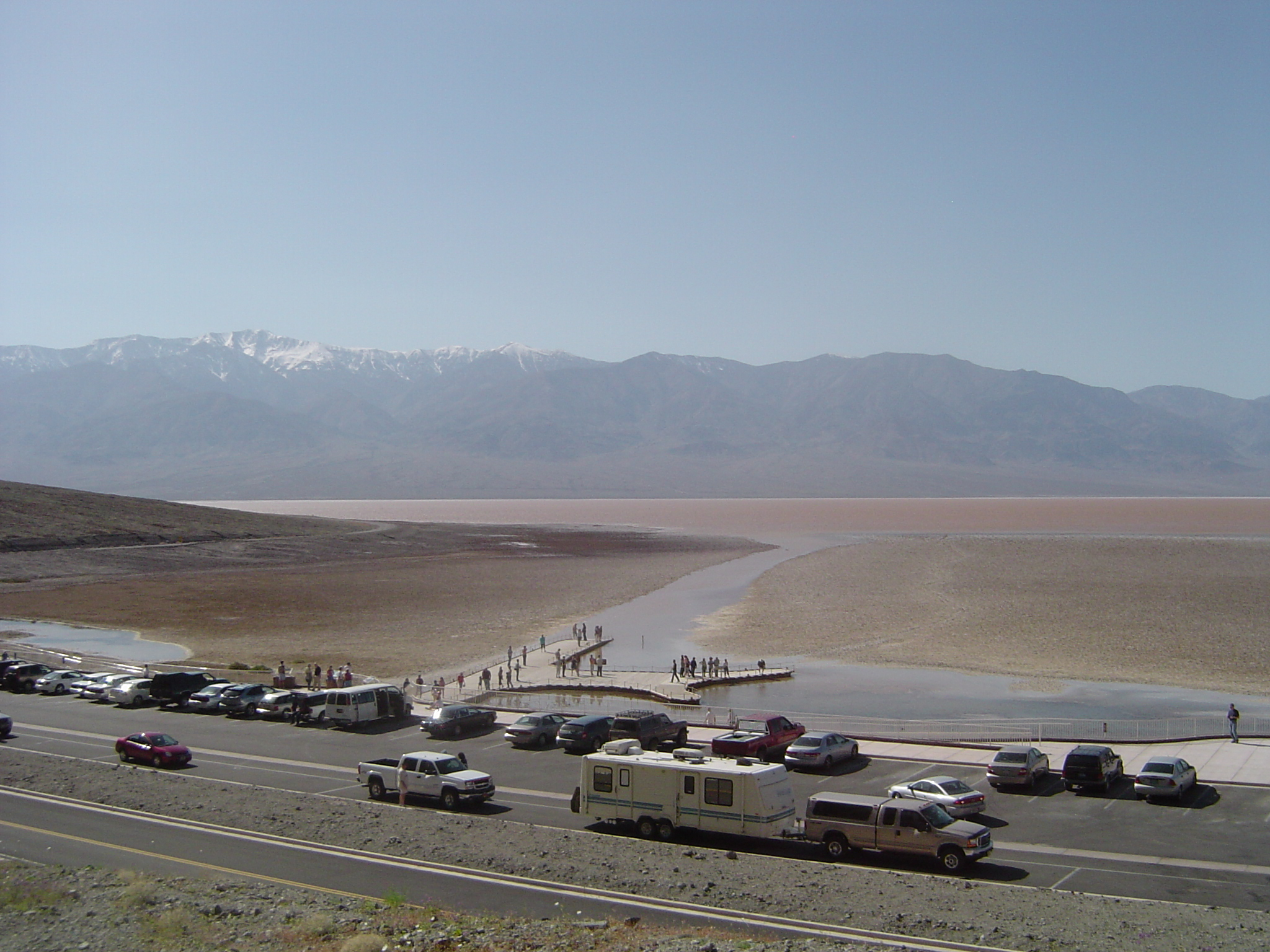
Unusually high precipitation caused an ephemeral lake to occur in the Badwater Basin of Death Valley National Park, 2005.

A Pineapple Express related storm battered Southern California from January 7–11, 2005. This storm was the largest to hit Southern California since the storms that hit during the 1997–98 El Niño event. The storm caused mud slides and flooding, with one desert location just north of Morongo Valley receiving about 9 inches (230 mm) of rain, and some locations on south and southwest-facing mountain slopes receiving spectacular totals: San Marcos Pass, in Santa Barbara County, received 24.57 inches (624 mm), and Opids Camp (AKA Camp Hi-Hill) in the San Gabriel Mountains of Los Angeles County was deluged with 31.61 inches (803 mm) of rain in the five-day period. In some areas the storm was followed by over a month of near-continuous rain.

=== Alaska, 2006 ===
The unusually intense rainstorms that hit south-central Alaska in October 2006 were called "Pineapple Express" rains locally.

=== Pacific Northwest, 2006 ===
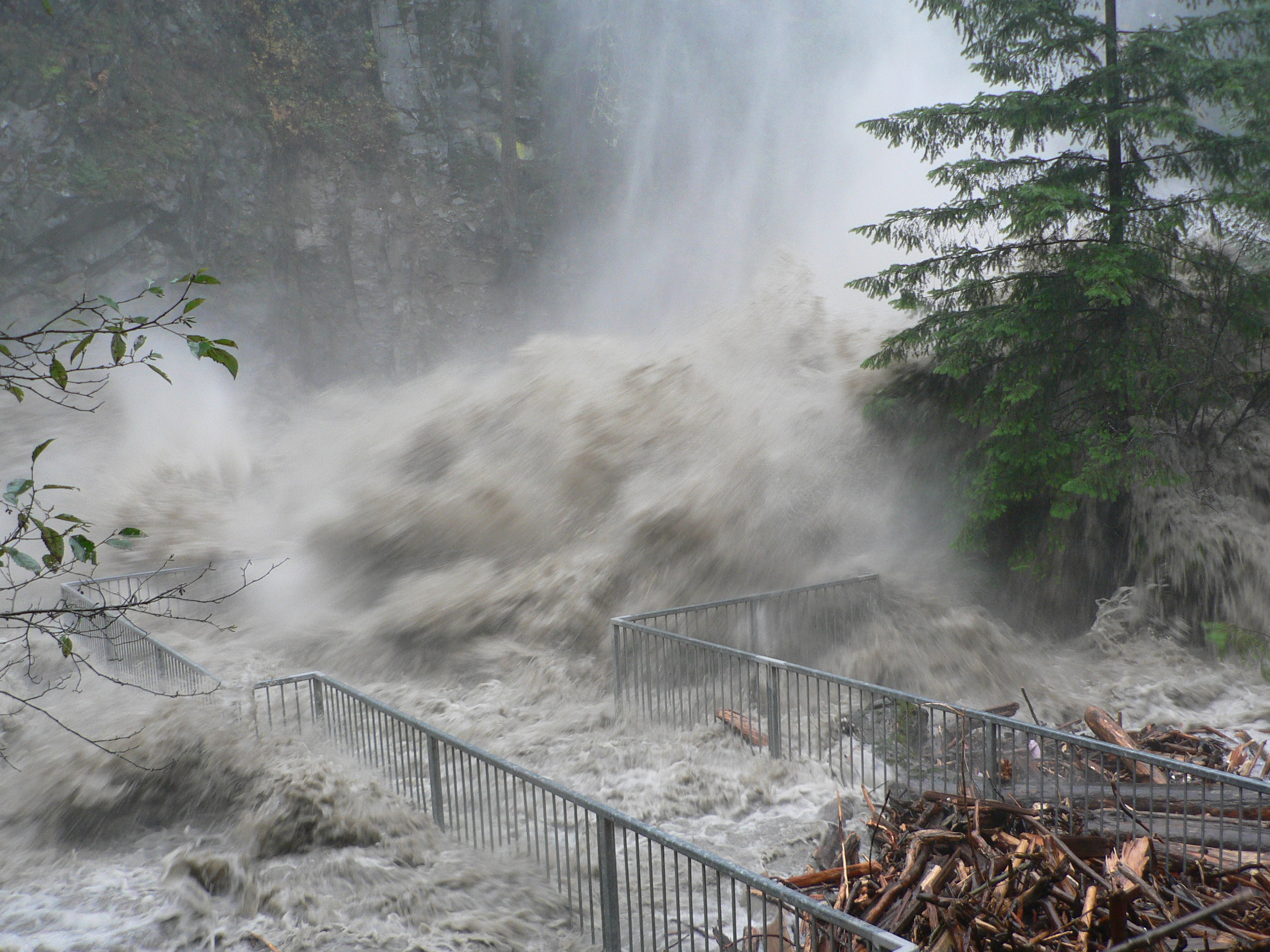
November 2006 flood, Granite Falls on the Stillaguamish River, Washington

The Puget Sound region from Olympia, Washington to Vancouver, British Columbia received several inches of rain per day in November 2006 from a series of successive Pineapple Express related storms that caused massive flooding in all major regional rivers and mudslides which closed the mountain passes. These storms included heavy winds which are not usually associated with the phenomenon. Regional dams opened their spillways to 100% as they had reached capacity because of rain and snowmelt. Officials referred to the storm system as "the worst in a decade" on 8 November 2006. Portions of Oregon were also affected, including over 14 inches (360 mm) in one day at Lees Camp in the Coast Range, while the normally arid and sheltered Interior of British Columbia received heavy, coastal-magnitude rains.

=== Southern California, December 2010 ===
In December 2010, a Pineapple Express system ravaged California from 15 to 22 December, bringing with it as much as 2 feet (610 mm) of rain to the San Gabriel Mountains, and over 13 feet (4.0 m) of snow in the Sierra Nevada. Although the entire state was affected, the Southern California counties of San Bernardino, Orange, Riverside, San Diego, and Los Angeles bore the brunt of the system of storms, as coastal and hillside areas were impacted by mudslides and major flooding.

This has been rainy season since the 1996-1997 event in Southern California.

=== California, December 2014 ===
In December 2014, a powerful winter storm enhanced by a Pineapple Express feature struck California, resulting in snow, wind, and flood watches. A blizzard warning was issued by the National Weather Service for the Northern Sierra Nevada for the first time in California since October 2009 and January 2008. The storm caused power outages for more than 50,000 people. It was thought to be the most powerful storm to impact California since the January 2010 California winter storms. A rare tornado touched down in Los Angeles on 12 December.

=== West Coast, 2017 ===
Historically strong storms associated with the Pineapple Express brought flooding and mudslides to California, particularly the San Francisco Bay Area, destroying homes and closing numerous roads, including State Route 17, State Route 35, State Route 37, Interstate 80, State Route 12, State Route 1, State Route 84, State Route 9 and State Route 152.

The storm brought major snow to the Sierra Nevada and San Gabriel Mountains. A state record was recorded with places on the Sierra reaching up to 800 inches (20 m) of snow. The storm also brought not only significant flooding to the Los Angeles area and most of southern California (killing about 3 people), but also significant severe weather in that area.

=== California, January 2021 ===
A powerful winter storm channeled a Pineapple Express into California from 26 to 29 January. One person was injured in one of the mudslides in Northern California, and many structures suffered damage. The storm killed at least two people in California. A significant length of California State Route 1 along the Big Sur collapsed into the ocean after massive amounts of rain were dumped, causing a debris flow onto the highway, which in turn triggered the collapse. In Southern California, the storm triggered widespread flooding and debris flows, forcing the evacuations of thousands of people and also causing widespread property damage. Salinas received 4 in (100 mm) of rainfall for the entire event causing mudflows that forced 7,000 people to evacuate. Across the State of California, the storm knocked out power to an estimated 575,000 people at one point, according to power outage tracking maps and PG&E. In the mountainous parts of the state, the winter storm dropped tremendous amounts of heavy snow, with Mammoth Mountain Ski Area receiving 94 in (240 cm) within 72 hours, and a total of 107 in (270 cm) of snowfall for the entire event. Blizzard conditions were also recorded on parts of the Sierra Nevada. Very high wind gusts were also observed, with gusts over 100 mph (160 km/h) observed at Alpine Meadows, peaking at 126 mph (203 km/h).

=== Pacific Northwest, 2021 ===
Heavy rains attributed to a Pineapple Express event heavily impacted the Puget Sound region from Bellingham, Washington into the British Columbia Interior and the Lower Mainland from 14 to 15 November. At the peak of the rainstorm on 15 November, Bellingham received 2.78 inches (71 mm) of rain while Hope, B.C. measured rainfall of 277.5 millimetres (10.93 in) from 14 to 15 November. The resulting floods and ensuing mass wasting events forced the closure of all major Canadian road connections to Vancouver, British Columbia including Highway 1, the Coquihalla, and the Sea to Sky Highway.

=== California, 2022–2023 ===
Heavy rains attributed to a Pineapple Express caused widespread flooding in the Bay Area.

=== California, February 2024 ===
A Pineapple Express storm hit the state from 1 to 2 February 2024, before moving over the United States and settling over the I-25 corridor in Colorado, where heavy snow fell. Another one hit 3 February and last until 5 February, with the National Weather Service calling it "potentially life-threatening." Other news sources estimated that Los Angeles received six-months' worth of rain in the 48-hour period, while the Sierra Nevada mountains got 1 to 3 ft (30 to 91 cm) of snow, with over 4 feet (120 cm) of snow expected in higher elevations, such as Mammoth Lakes, CA. Parts of the San Bernardino Mountains' foothills received 10 to 12 in (250 to 300 mm) of rain.

== See also ==
- ARkStorm
- Pacific Organized Track System
- Siberian Express
- Typhoon Cimaron (2006)
