= North Atlantic Track Agreement =

The North Atlantic Track Agreement was an agreement in November 1898 among thirteen passenger steamship companies to use a set series of trans-Atlantic routes that stretched from the northeast of North America to western Europe for the Atlantic crossing. Following the tracks was recommended but not compulsory.

There were seven routes: three to Canada and four to New York and Boston. The two main routes are 60 miles (97 km) apart to prevent collisions.

The agreement was given government recognition in the 1948 Safety-at-Sea-Convention.

== Members ==
- 9 British - White Star Line,
- 1 American
- 1 Belgian
- 1 French
- 1 Dutch
