= Aireon =

American satellite-based aircraft tracking company

Aireon LLC
- Type: Subsidiary
- Industry: Aviation data services Air traffic management
- Founded: 2011
- Headquarters: McLean, Virginia, United States
- Area served: Worldwide
- Key people: Don Thoma (CEO)
- Products: Global ATS Surveillance; AireonSTREAM; AireonFLOW; AireonINSIGHTS; AireonVECTOR
- Services: Space-based ADS-B air traffic surveillance Aviation data services
- Parent: Iridium Communications
- Website: aireon.com

Aireon is an American aviation surveillance and data company based in McLean, Virginia, and a wholly owned subsidiary of Iridium Communications. It operates a global space-based ADS-B system that receives aircraft position broadcasts using payloads hosted on the Iridium satellite constellation. Formed by Iridium in 2011, Aireon subsequently received investments from five national air navigation service providers. Its surveillance system began operations in 2019, and Iridium acquired the remaining equity in the company in 2026.

== History ==
Iridium Communications formed Aireon in 2011 to develop and market a space-based ADS-B air traffic surveillance service. Aireon was initially a wholly owned subsidiary of Iridium. In November 2012, Nav Canada made its first equity investment in the company under an agreement allowing it to acquire a controlling interest. ENAV, Naviair, the Irish Aviation Authority and NATS later became investors.

In September 2016, Aireon launched a partnership with FlightAware to provide space-based ADS-B data to airlines and other aircraft operators, with Qatar Airways as the launch customer.

In January 2017, Aireon launched and deployed its first ADS-B payloads on Iridium NEXT satellites. Seven launches followed. The eighth and final launch in January 2019 completed the constellation and brought the total number of Aireon payloads in orbit to 75, consisting of 66 operational payloads and nine spares.

On April 2, 2019, Aireon announced the launch of its satellite-based air traffic control surveillance system, providing continuous tracking of ADS-B-equipped aircraft over oceans and other areas outside the coverage of terrestrial surveillance systems. In June 2019, the European Union Aviation Safety Agency certified Aireon to provide surveillance services in support of aircraft separation.

In May 2026, Iridium agreed to acquire the approximately 61% of Aireon that it did not already own for about $367 million and to assume approximately $155 million of Aireon's debt. At the time the transaction was announced, Aireon's system was tracking an average of about 190,000 flights per day. Iridium completed the acquisition on July 2, 2026, making Aireon a wholly owned subsidiary.

== Technology ==
ADS-B-equipped aircraft transmit short data packets containing identification, position and other information. The system was intended to be used with ground-based receivers. Through its receivers in space, Aireon monitors these transmissions, providing coverage where there is no ground infrastructure and relaying signals from ADS-B-equipped aircraft to air traffic controllers.

The Aireon receiver payloads are hosted on the Iridium NEXT low-Earth-orbit satellite constellation.

Aireon's receiver data are also processed by FlightAware, which has partnered with Aireon to provide data to airlines, other aircraft operators and the public.

Aireon's ICAO designator is AEN.
