= Reduced vertical separation minima =

Reduction of aircraft height separation

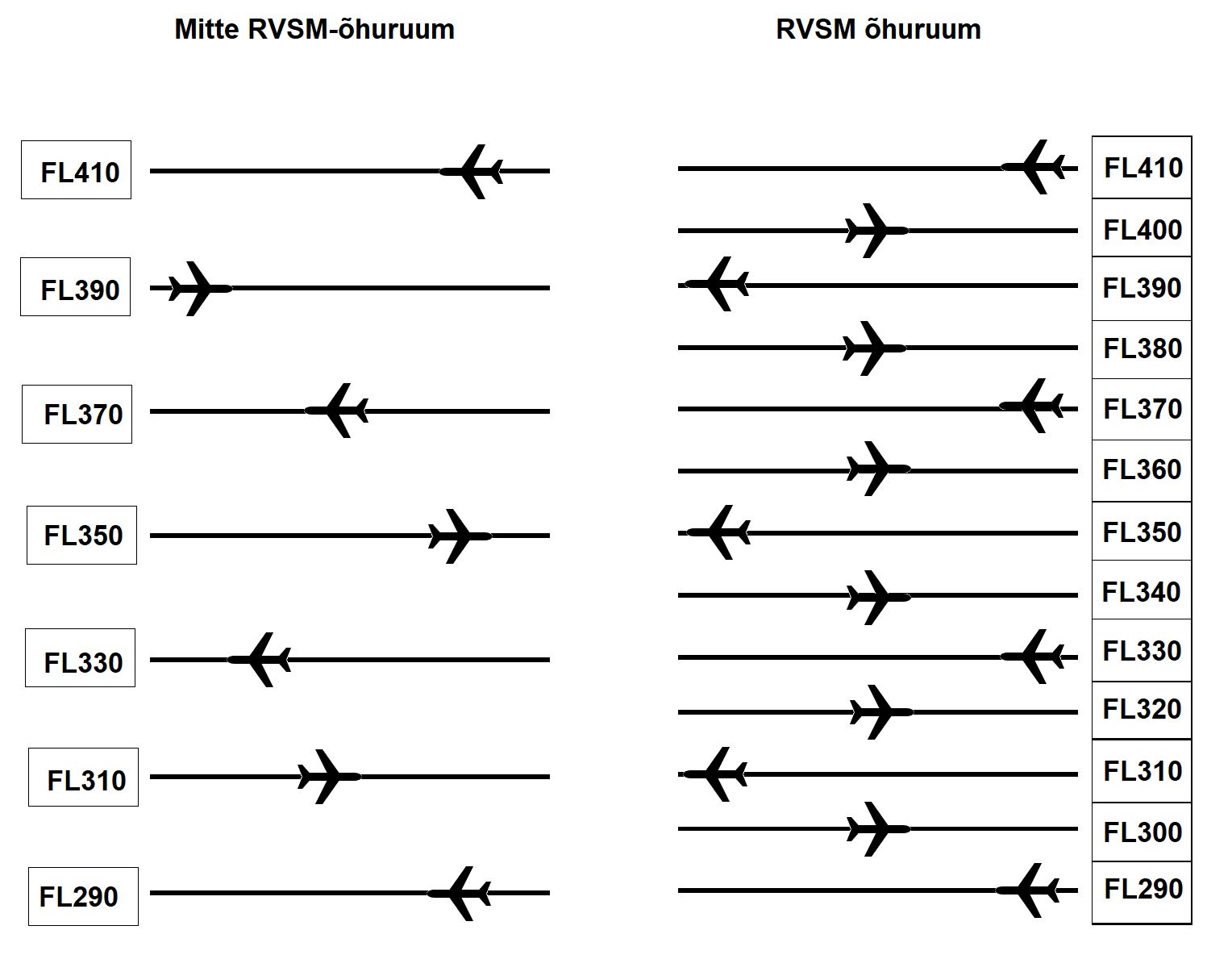
Vertical separation without RVSM (left) and with RVSM (right)

Reduced vertical separation minimum (RVSM) is the reduction, from 2,000 feet to 1,000 feet, of the standard vertical separation required between aircraft flying between flight level 290 (29,000 ft) and flight level 410 (41,000 ft). This reduction in vertical separation minimum therefore increases the number of aircraft that can fly in a particular volume of controlled airspace.

== Historical background ==
In the 1940s (original ICAO regulations), standard separation was 1000 feet except in specific circumstances, when it was 500 feet. In 1958 the standard vertical separation of aircraft in controlled airspace was set at 1,000 feet from ground level or sea level to flight level 290, and at 2,000 feet above flight level 290. The larger minimum separation at higher altitudes was necessary because the accuracy of altimeters, used to determine altitude by measuring air pressure, decreases with height. Efforts to reduce this separation above flight level 290 began almost immediately, but doing so without compromising safety required improvements in altimeters and other equipment, due in part to inherent difficulties in accurately determining and maintaining aircraft altitudes and, therefore, the actual vertical distance between aircraft. It was not until the 1990s that air data computers (ADCs), altimeters, and autopilot systems became sufficiently accurate to safely reduce the vertical separation minimum. Thus, RVSM in effect constituted a return to the original procedures established in the mid-1940s, with the notable difference that 500 feet separation is only permitted between IFR and VFR flights (on non-converging tracks).

== Implementation ==
Between 1997 and 2005 RVSM was implemented in all of Europe, North Africa, Southeast Asia and North America, South America, and over the North Atlantic, South Atlantic, and Pacific Oceans. The North Atlantic implemented initially in March 1997 at flight levels 330 through 370. The entire western hemisphere implemented RVSM FL290–FL410 on January 20, 2005. Africa implemented it on September 25, 2008.

The People's Republic of China implemented metric RVSM on 21 November 2007. But the Hong Kong FIR continued to use flight levels in feet.

The Russian Federation implemented RVSM and flight levels in feet on November 17, 2011. However, in some FIRs, meters are still in use below transition level.

== Requirements ==
Only aircraft with specially certified altimeters and autopilots may fly in RVSM airspace, otherwise the aircraft must fly lower or higher than the airspace, or seek special exemption from the requirements. Additionally, aircraft operators (airlines or corporate operators) must receive specific approval from the aircraft's state of registry to conduct operations in RVSM airspace. Non RVSM approved aircraft may transit through RVSM airspace provided they are given continuous climb/descent throughout the designated airspace, and 2,000 ft vertical separation is provided at all times between the non-RVSM flight, and all others for the duration of the climb/descent.

"State aircraft", which includes aircraft used in military, customs and police service, are exempted from the requirement to be RVSM approved. Participating states have been requested, however, to adapt their state aircraft for RVSM approval, to the extent possible, and especially those aircraft used for General Air Traffic (GAT).

If the RVSM level is exceeded it is an 'incident' and needs to be reported within 72 hours.

Equipment Requirements:

- Two independent altitude measuring systems
  - For each condition in the full RVSM flight envelope, the largest combined absolute value for residual static source error plus the avionics error may not exceed 200 feet
- SSR (secondary surveillance radar) altitude reporting transponder
- Altitude alert system that signals an alert when the altitude displayed to the flight crew deviates from the selected altitude by more than (in most cases) 200 feet
- Autopilot with altitude control
  - Within a tolerance band of ±65 feet about an acquired altitude when the aircraft is operated in straight-and-level flight
  - Within a tolerance band of ±130 feet under no turbulent, conditions for aircraft for which application for type certification occurred on or before April 9, 1997 that are equipped with an automatic altitude control system with flight management/performance system inputs
- Flight Crew approved training program / Op Specs Approval
- No damage outside the Structural Repair Manual (SRM) limits in the RVSM critical areas
- Aircraft with TCAS must have compatibility with RVSM Operations

== See also ==
- Acronyms and abbreviations in avionics
- Aviation safety
- Flight level
- List of aviation, aerospace and aeronautical abbreviations
- North Atlantic Tracks
- Strategic lateral offset procedure
- Traffic collision avoidance system (TCAS)
