= Pacific Organized Track System =

Air routes between Asia and North America

The Pacific Organised Track System (PACOTS) comprises airways used primarily for travel between Asia and the west coast of North America. Similar to the North Atlantic Tracks, PACOTS routes are flexible due to jet streams. Eastbound tracks are numbered while westbound ones are lettered.

== See also ==
- North Atlantic Tracks
- Pineapple Express
- Siberian Express
