= Separation (aeronautics) =

Concept for keeping aircraft safe distances apart

In air traffic control, separation is the concept of keeping an aircraft outside a minimum distance from another aircraft to reduce the risk of those aircraft colliding, as well as prevent accidents due to secondary factors, such as wake turbulence. Separation can also apply to terrain, obstacles, and controlled airspace, wherein an aircraft must stay at a minimum distance from a block of airspace; as an example, all aircraft must be approved by the controller responsible for the airspace before the aircraft is approved to enter that sector.

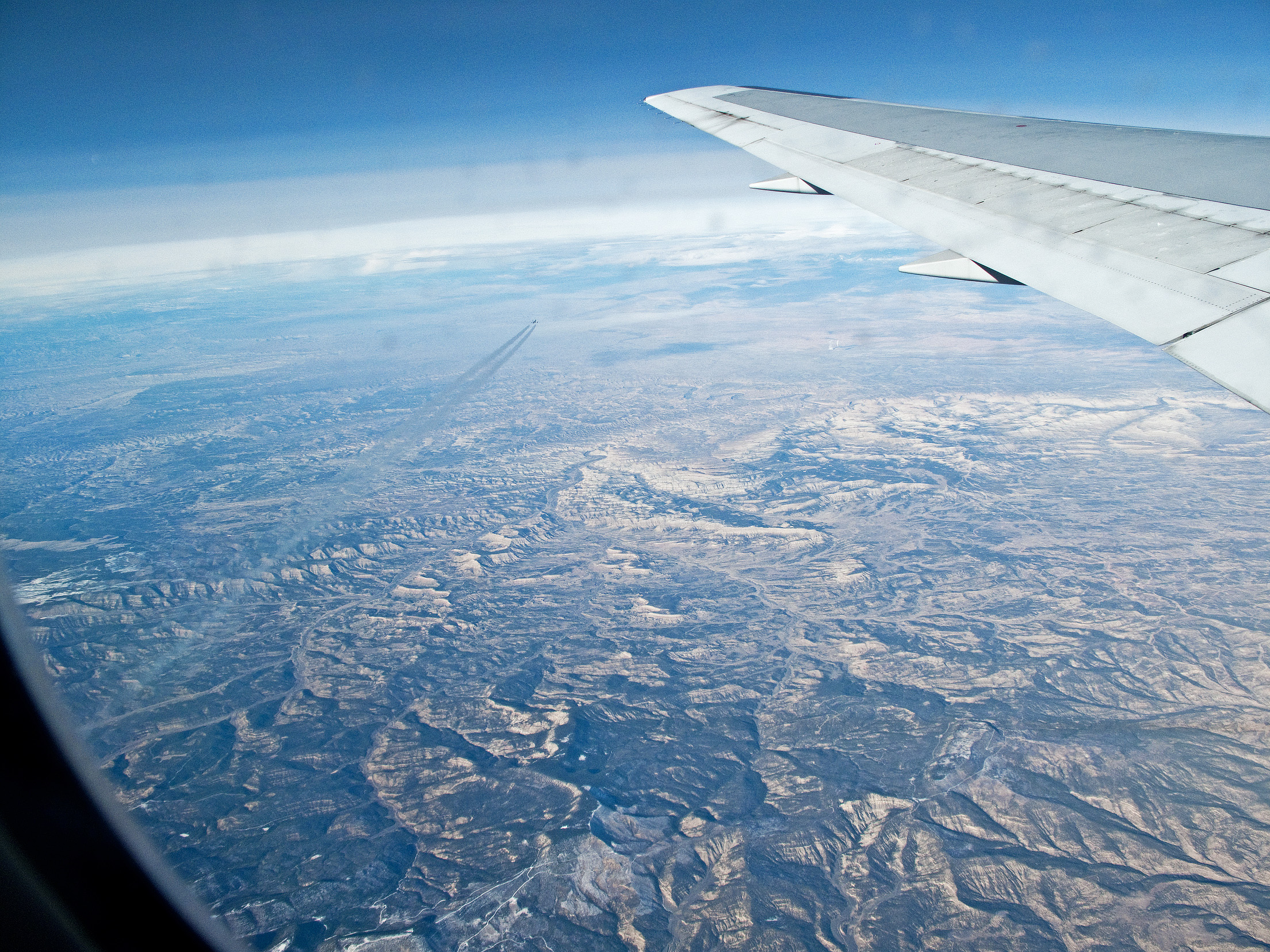
Separation at cruising altitude (aircraft passing below).

Air traffic controllers apply rules, known as separation minima, to do this. Pairs of aircraft to which these rules have been successfully applied are said to be separated: the risk of these aircraft colliding is therefore remote. If separation is lost between two aircraft, they are said to be in a conflict.

When an aircraft passes behind or follows another aircraft, wake turbulence minima are applied due to the effect of the wingtip vortices of the preceding aircraft on the following aircraft. These minima vary depending on the relative size of the two aircraft. This is acute on final approach with a smaller aircraft following larger aircraft. Wake turbulence categories are typically used.

== Need ==
It is a common misconception that air traffic controllers keep all aircraft separated. Whether aircraft actually need separating depends upon the class of airspace in which the aircraft are flying, and the flight rules under which the pilot is operating the aircraft. As stated by the U.S. FAA, The pilot has the ultimate responsibility for ensuring appropriate separations and positioning of the aircraft in the terminal area to avoid the wake turbulence created by a preceding aircraft.

There are three sets of flight rules under which an aircraft can be flown:

- Visual Flight Rules (VFR)
- Special Visual Flight Rules (SVFR)
- Instrument Flight Rules (IFR)

Public transport flights are almost exclusively operated under IFR, as this set of rules allows flight in regions of low visibility (e.g. cloud). On the other hand, a large amount of private flying in light aircraft is done under VFR since this requires a lower level of flying skill on the part of the pilot, and meteorological conditions in which a pilot can see and avoid other aircraft. SVFR is a special infrequently-used set of rules. For the purposes of separation, controllers consider SVFR to be the same as IFR.

Airspace exists in seven classes, A to G, in decreasing order of air traffic control regulation. Classes A to E are controlled airspace and class G is uncontrolled airspace. In class A and B airspace, all aircraft must be separated from each other, while in class G airspace there is no requirement for any aircraft to be separated. In the intermediate classes some aircraft are separated from each other depending on the flight rules under which the aircraft are operating. For example, in class D airspace, IFR aircraft are separated from other IFR aircraft, but not from VFR aircraft, nor are VFR aircraft separated from each other.

== Vertical separation ==
Between the surface and an altitude of 29,000 feet (8,800 m), separation rules state that no aircraft should come closer vertically than 300 metres, unless some form of horizontal separation is provided (For countries that measure altitude in feet, a 1,000 feet minimum is observed). Above 29,000 feet (8,800 m), the minimum vertical distance is increased to 600 m (or 2,000 feet), except in airspace where Reduced Vertical Separation Minima (RVSM) can be applied.

=== RVSM ===
In certain airspace, between 29,000 and 41,000 feet (12,500 m), pairs of aircraft equipped with more modern altimeter and autopilot systems can be vertically separated by minimum of 1,000 feet (300 m) rather than the standard 2,000 feet (600 m).

RVSM airspace encompasses Europe, North America, parts of Asia and Africa and both the Pacific and Atlantic oceans. In areas where RVSM capabilities exist, 1,000 feet of vertical separation may be utilized up to FL410 (41,000 ft), and 2,000 between FL410 and FL600 (60,000 ft). 5,000 ft vertical separation must be applied to military aircraft above FL600, RVSM or not.

Military Assumes Responsibility for Separating Aircraft (MARSA) separation can be applied by military aircraft, which overrides all of these rules. Under MARSA conditions, air traffic controllers protect only a block of airspace around multiple military aircraft. They are treated as one, and given only one data tag on the controller's scope.

== Horizontal separation ==
If any two aircraft are separated by less than the vertical separation minimum, then some form of horizontal separation must exist.

=== Procedural separation ===
Procedural separation, or temporal separation, is separation based upon the position of the aircraft, based strictly on timing. It therefore does not necessarily require the use of radar to provide air traffic control using procedural separation minima. In procedural control, any period during which two aircraft are not vertically separated is said to be "level change". In some cases, procedural separation minima are provided for use with radar assistance.

==== Lateral separation ====
Lateral separation minima are usually based upon the position of the aircraft as derived visually, from dead reckoning or internal navigation sources, or from radio navigation beacons.

In the case of beacons, to be separated, the aircraft must be a certain distance from the beacon, measured by time or by Distance Measuring Equipment (DME), and their tracks to or from the beacon must diverge by a minimum angle.

Other lateral separation may be defined by the geography of pre-determined routes, for example the North Atlantic Track system.

==== Longitudinal separation ====
If two aircraft are not laterally separated, and are following tracks within 45 degrees of each other, then they are said to be following the same route and some form of longitudinal separation must exist.

Longitudinal separation can be based upon time or distance as measure by DME. No two aircraft following the same route must come within 15 minutes flying time of each other. In areas with good navaid cover this reduces to 10 minutes; if the preceding aircraft is faster than the following one then this can be reduced further depending on the difference in speed.

Aircraft whose tracks bisect at more than 45 degrees are said to be crossing. In this case, longitudinal separation cannot be applied as lateral separation will soon exist again.

=== Radar separation ===
Radar separation is applied by a controller observing that the radar returns from the two aircraft are a certain minimum horizontal distance away from each other, as observed on a suitably calibrated radar system. The actual distance used varies: 5NM (9.26 km) is common in en route airspace, 3 NM is common in terminal airspace at lower levels. On occasion, 10 NM may be used, especially at long range or in regions of less reliable radar coverage.

As a practical example of the rules, US Federal Aviation Administration (FAA) rules are published in the FAA Order 7110.65; the rules allow different separation distances (from 3NM to 10NM) depending on the aircraft, distance from radar antenna, type of radar used, flight level, etc.

=== Reduced separation ===
In certain special cases, controllers may reduce separation below the usually required minima.

==== In the vicinity of an aerodrome ====
Aerodrome or "Tower" controllers work in tall towers with large windows allowing them, in good weather, to see the aircraft flying in the vicinity of the aerodrome, unless the aircraft is not in sight from the tower (e.g. a helicopter departing from a ramp area). Also, aircraft in the vicinity of an aerodrome tend to be flying at lower speeds. Therefore, if the aerodrome controller can see both aircraft, or both aircraft report that they can see each other, or a following aircraft reports that it can see the preceding one, controllers may reduce the standard separation to whatever is adequate to prevent a collision.

Under its Single European Sky ATM Research (SESAR) project, Eurocontrol is optimizing the slack of the separation, reducing it from 3 to 2.5 nmi (5.6 to 4.6 km): a simulation increased throughput by up to 14% at Zurich Airport's Runway 14, which cannot have any high-speed exit, inducing a longer runway occupancy.

== Conflicts ==
A conflict is an event in which two or more aircraft experience a loss of minimum separation.

=== Local conflict ===
A local conflict occurs if two or more aircraft pass a certain given point (in nearly all cases a certain town). A local conflict occurs, if at least one of the following conditions are met:

- The distance in time is 4 minutes or less, and
- The distance in space is 30 flight units (i.e. 30 nautical miles) or less.

=== Opposite conflict ===
An opposite conflict occurs if two aircraft are flying towards each other from opposing directions. Looking at the information on the flight progress strips, a controller can detect an opposite conflict by checking:

- If one aircraft is flying from city A to city B and another from city B to city A,
- If comparisons of the temporal distance of the first plane over city A with that of the second plane over city B and that of the second plane over city A with the first plane over city B lead to a separation of 4 minutes or less at any time during their flights, or
- If comparisons of the topical altitude of the first plane over city A with that of the second plane over city B and then the altitude of the second plane over city A with that of the first plane over city B give a separation of 30 flight units (nautical miles) or less at any time during their flights.

== See also ==
- Self-separation
- Traffic collision avoidance system – Aircraft collision avoidance system
