= Glass cockpit =

Aircraft cockpit with electronic displays

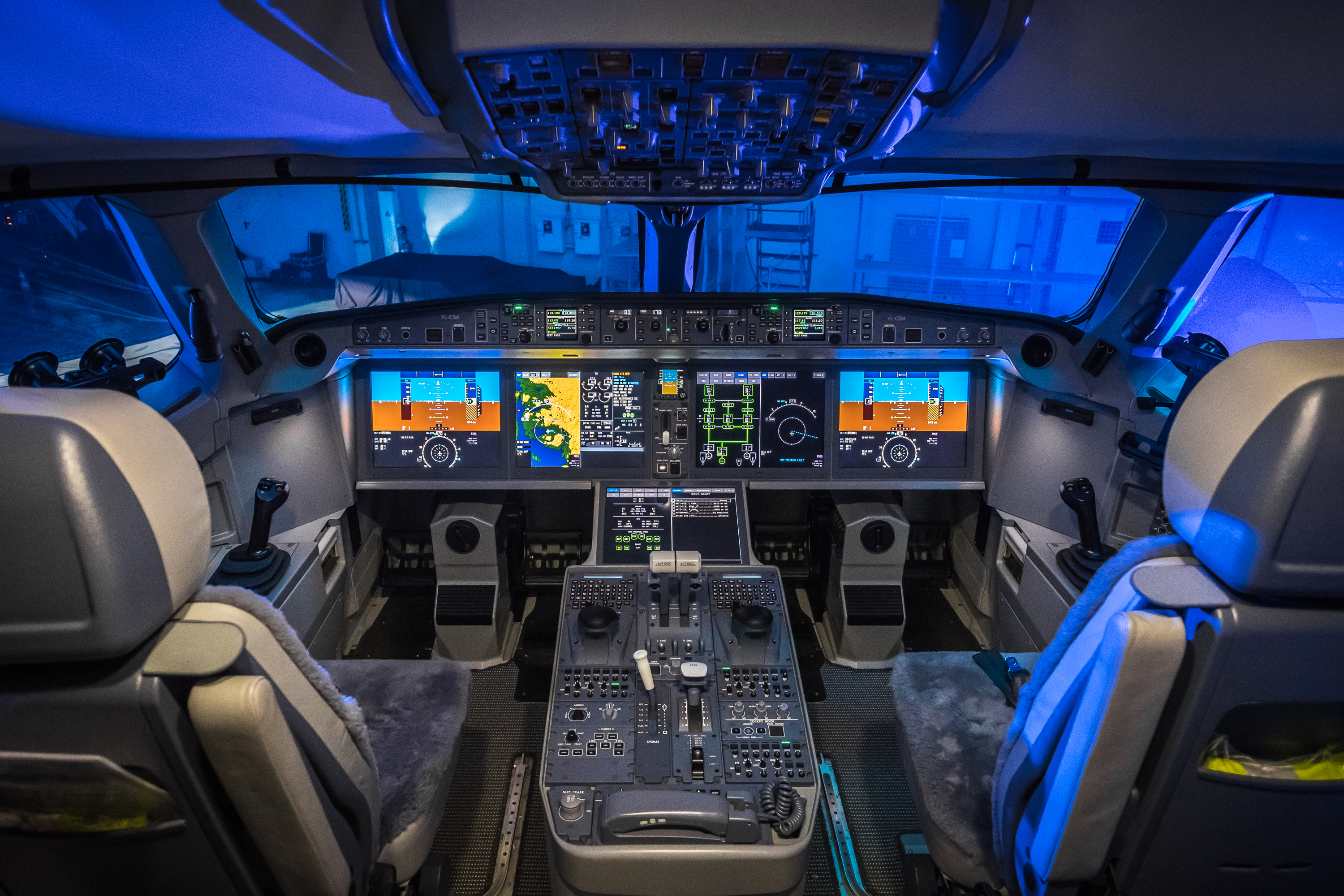
Simplified glass cockpit of an Airbus A220, featuring unified LCD screens for both pilots to reduce pilot workload

A glass cockpit is a cockpit, as used in aircraft and spacecraft, that features an array of electronic (digital) flight instrument displays, typically large LCD screens, rather than traditional analog dials and gauges. While a traditional cockpit relies on numerous mechanical gauges (nicknamed "steam gauges") to display information, a glass cockpit uses several multi-function displays and a primary flight display driven by flight management systems that can be adjusted to show flight information as needed. This simplifies aircraft operation and navigation and allows pilots to focus only on the most pertinent information. They are also popular with airlines as they eliminate the need for a flight engineer, saving costs. In recent years the technology has also become widely available in small aircraft.

As aircraft displays have modernized, the sensors that feed them have modernized as well. Traditional gyroscopic flight instruments have been replaced by electronic attitude and heading reference systems (AHRS) and air data computers (ADCs), improving reliability and reducing cost and maintenance. GPS receivers are usually integrated into glass cockpits.

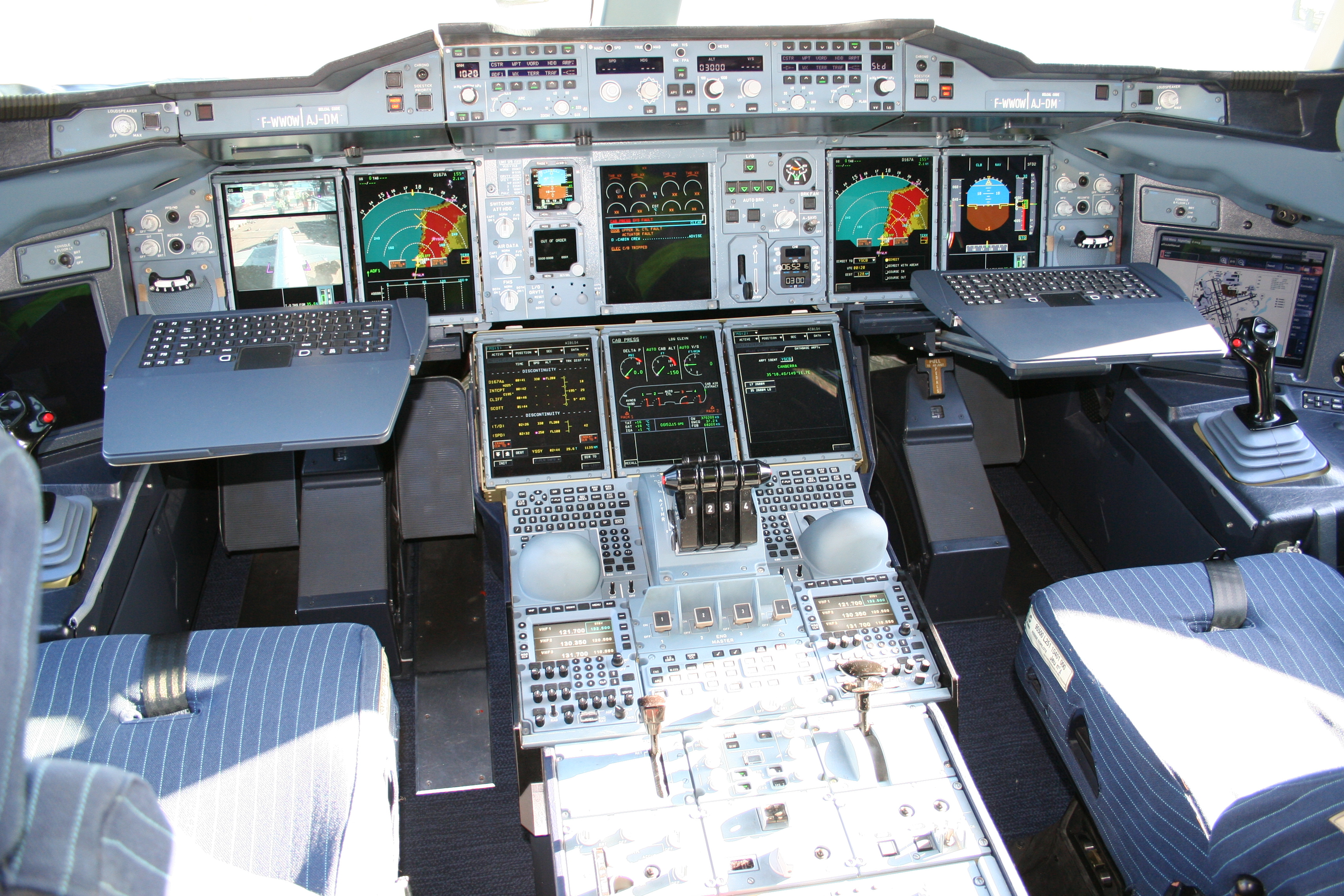
Airbus A380 glass cockpit featuring "pull out" keyboards and two wide computer screens on the sides for the pilots.

Early glass cockpits, found in the McDonnell Douglas MD-80, Boeing 737 Classic, ATR 42, ATR 72, Airbus A300-600 and A310, used electronic flight instrument systems (EFIS) to display attitude and navigational information only, with traditional mechanical gauges retained for airspeed, altitude, vertical speed, and engine performance. The Boeing 757 and 767 (-200 and -300) introduced an electronic engine-indicating and crew-alerting system (EICAS) system for monitoring engine performance while retaining mechanical gauges for airspeed, altitude and vertical speed.

Later glass cockpits, found in the Boeing 737NG, 747-400, 767-400, 777, Airbus A320, later Airbuses, Ilyushin Il-96 and Tupolev Tu-204 have completely replaced the mechanical gauges and warning lights in previous generations of aircraft. While glass cockpit-equipped aircraft throughout the late 20th century still retained analog altimeters, attitude, and airspeed indicators as standby instruments in case the EFIS displays failed, more modern aircraft have increasingly been using digital standby instruments as well, such as the integrated standby instrument system.

== History ==
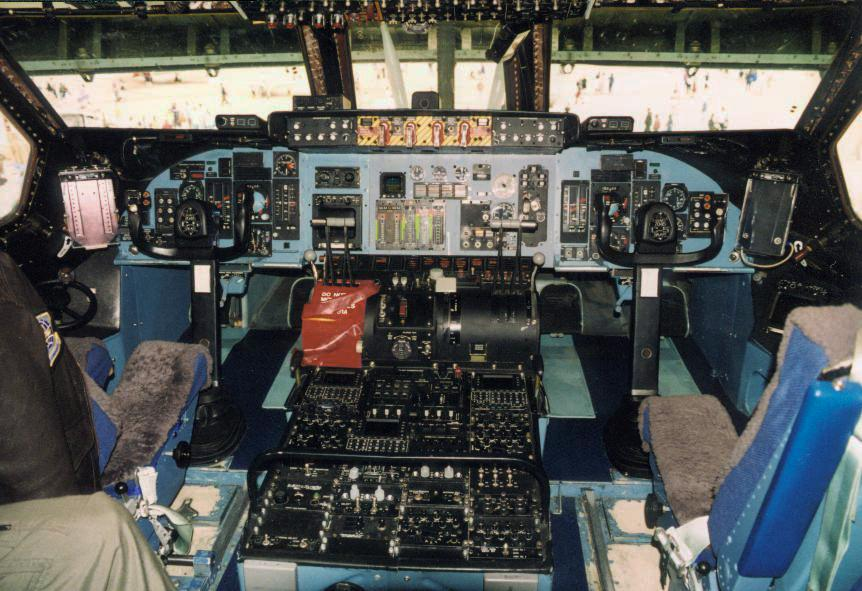
Analog instrument panel of a C-5A

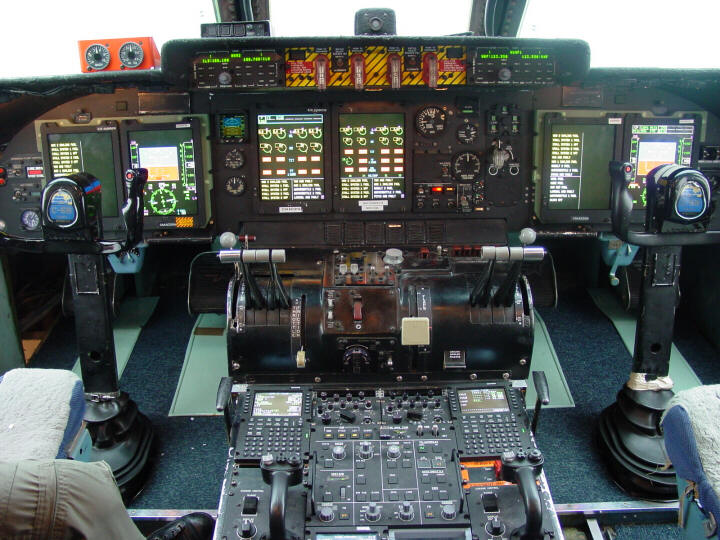
Upgraded "glass" C-5M instrument panel

Glass cockpits originated in military aircraft in the late 1960s and early 1970s; an early example is the Mark II avionics of the F-111D (first ordered in 1967, delivered from 1970 to 1973), which featured a multi-function display.

Prior to the 1970s, air transport operations were not considered sufficiently demanding to require advanced equipment like electronic flight displays. Also, computer technology was not at a level where sufficiently light and powerful electronics were available. The increasing complexity of transport aircraft, the advent of digital systems and the growing air traffic congestion around airports began to change that.

The Boeing 2707 was one of the earliest commercial aircraft designed with a glass cockpit. Most cockpit instruments were still analog, but cathode-ray tube (CRT) displays were to be used for the attitude indicator and horizontal situation indicator (HSI). However, the 2707 was cancelled in 1971 after insurmountable technical difficulties and ultimately the end of project funding by the US government.

The average transport aircraft in the mid-1970s had more than one hundred cockpit instruments and controls, and the primary flight instruments were already crowded with indicators, crossbars, and symbols, and the growing number of cockpit elements were competing for cockpit space and pilot attention. As a result, NASA conducted research on displays that could process the raw aircraft system and flight data into an integrated, easily understood picture of the flight situation, culminating in a series of flights demonstrating a full glass cockpit system.

The success of the NASA-led glass cockpit work is reflected in the total acceptance of electronic flight displays. The safety and efficiency of flights have been increased with improved pilot understanding of the aircraft's situation relative to its environment (or "situational awareness").

By the end of the 1990s, liquid-crystal display (LCD) panels were increasingly favored among aircraft manufacturers because of their efficiency, reliability and legibility. Earlier LCD panels suffered from poor legibility at some viewing angles and poor response times, making them unsuitable for aviation. Modern aircraft such as the Boeing 737 Next Generation, 777, 717, 747-400ER, 747-8F, 767-400ER, 747-8, and 787, Airbus A320 family (later versions), A330 (later versions), A340-500/600, A340-300 (later versions), A380 and A350 are fitted with glass cockpits consisting of LCD units.

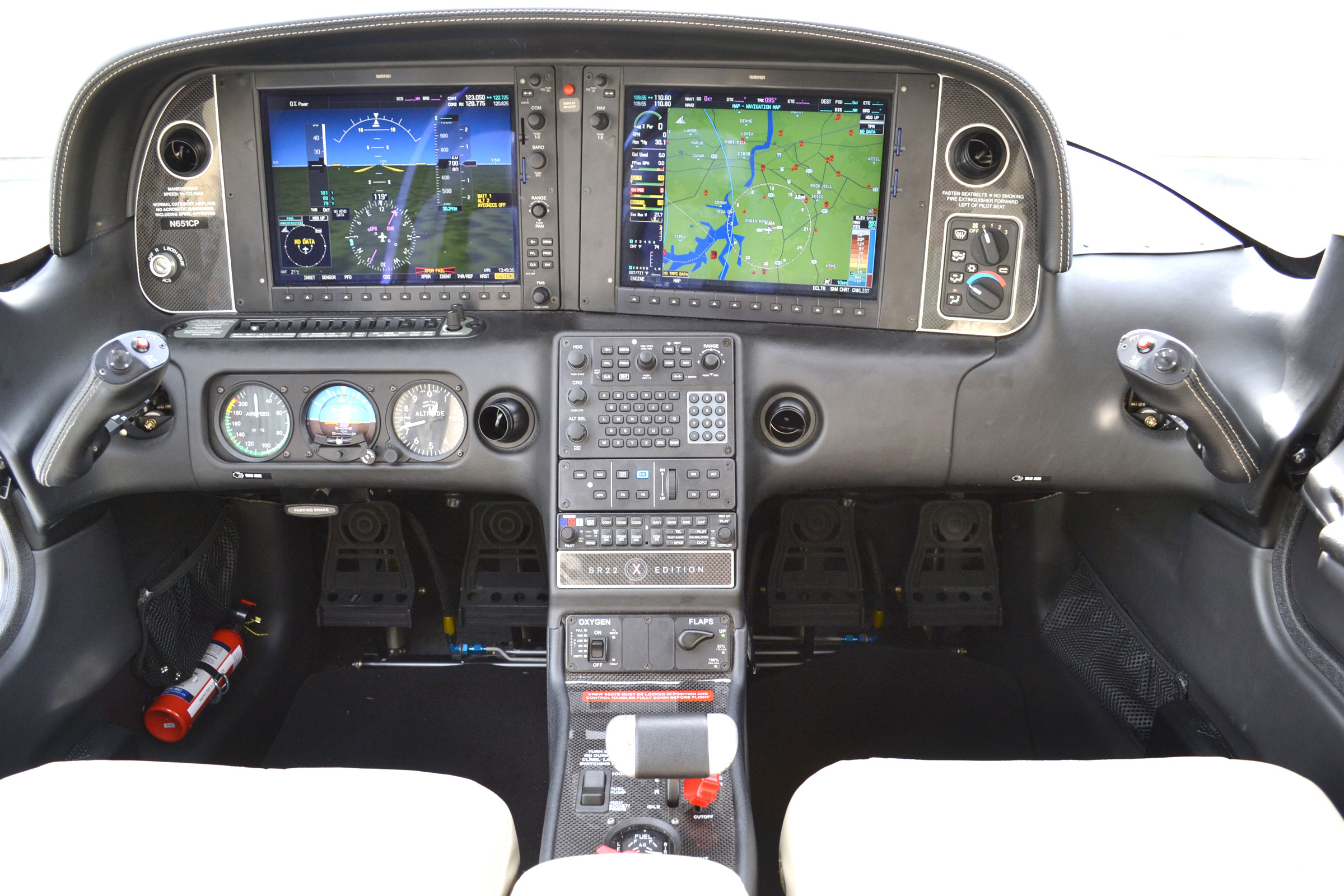
Glass cockpit in a Cirrus SR22. Note the three analog standby instruments near the bottom of the main instrument panel

The glass cockpit has become standard equipment in airliners, business jets, and military aircraft. It was fitted into NASA's Space Shuttle orbiters Atlantis, Columbia, Discovery, and Endeavour, and the Russian Soyuz TMA model spacecraft that were launched for the first time in 2002. By the end of the century glass cockpits began appearing in general aviation aircraft as well. In 2003, Cirrus Design's SR20 and SR22 became the first light aircraft equipped with glass cockpits, which they made standard on all Cirrus aircraft. By 2005, even basic trainers like the Piper Cherokee and Cessna 172 were shipping with glass cockpits as options (which nearly all customers chose), as well as many modern utility aircraft such as the Diamond DA42. The Lockheed Martin F-35 Lightning II features a "panoramic cockpit display" touchscreen that replaces most of the switches and toggles found in an aircraft cockpit. The civilian Cirrus Vision SF50 has the same, which they call a "Perspective Touch" glass cockpit.

== Uses ==
=== Commercial aviation ===
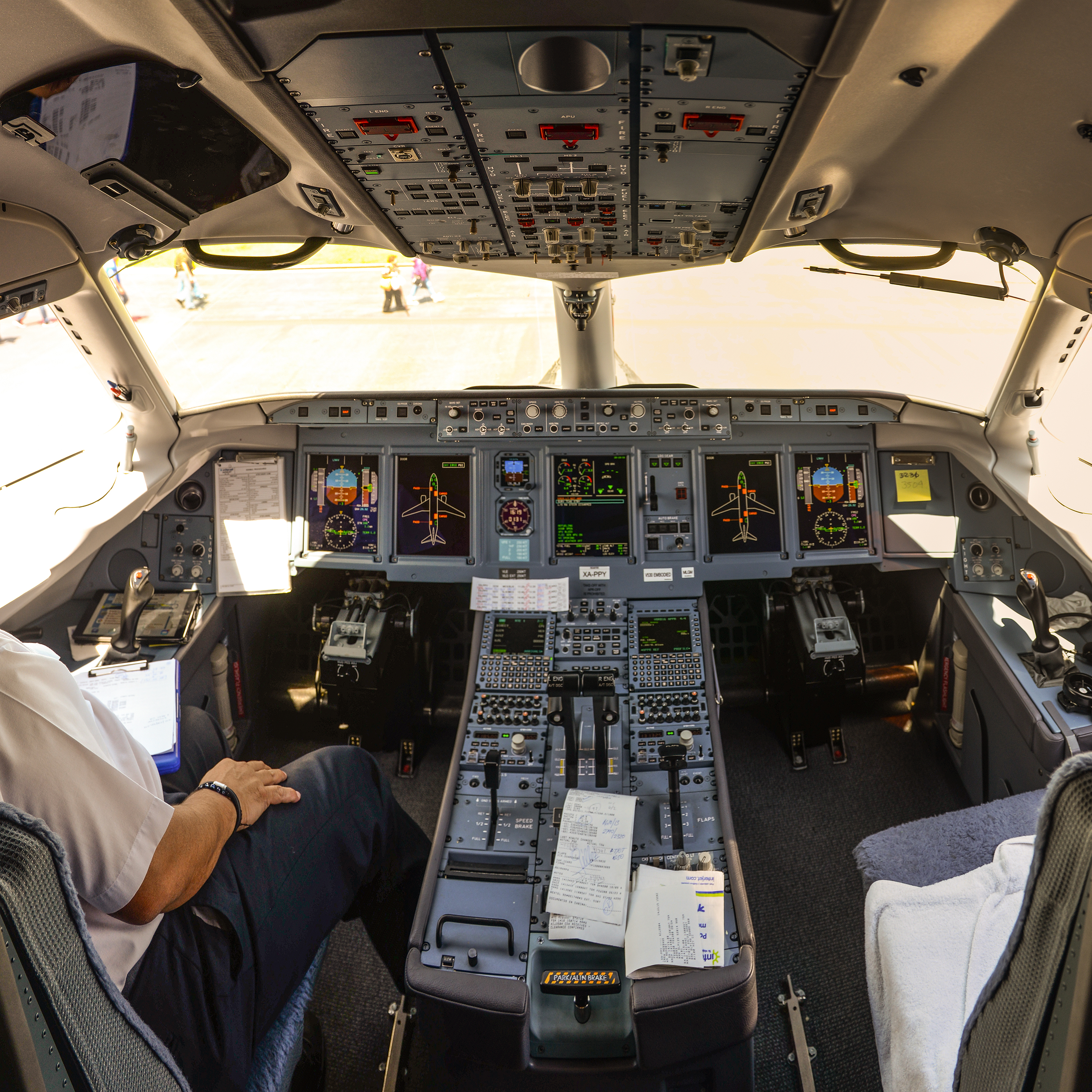
Sukhoi Superjet 100 glass cockpit

Unlike the previous era of glass cockpits—where designers merely copied the look and feel of conventional electromechanical instruments onto cathode-ray tubes—the new displays represent a true departure. They look and behave very similarly to other computers, with windows and data that can be manipulated with point-and-click devices. They also add terrain, approach charts, weather, vertical displays, and 3D navigation images.

The improved concepts enable aircraft makers to customize cockpits to a greater degree than previously. All of the manufacturers involved have chosen to do so in one way or another—such as using a trackball, thumb pad or joystick as a pilot-input device in a computer-style environment. Many of the modifications offered by the aircraft manufacturers improve situational awareness and customize the human-machine interface to increase safety.

Modern glass cockpits might include synthetic vision systems (SVS) or enhanced flight vision systems (EFVS). Synthetic vision systems display a realistic 3D depiction of the outside world (similar to a flight simulator), based on a database of terrain and geophysical features in conjunction with the attitude and position information gathered from the aircraft navigational systems. Enhanced flight vision systems add real-time information from external sensors, such as an infrared camera.

All new airliners such as the Airbus A380, Boeing 787 and private jets such as Bombardier Global Express and Learjet use glass cockpits.

=== General aviation ===
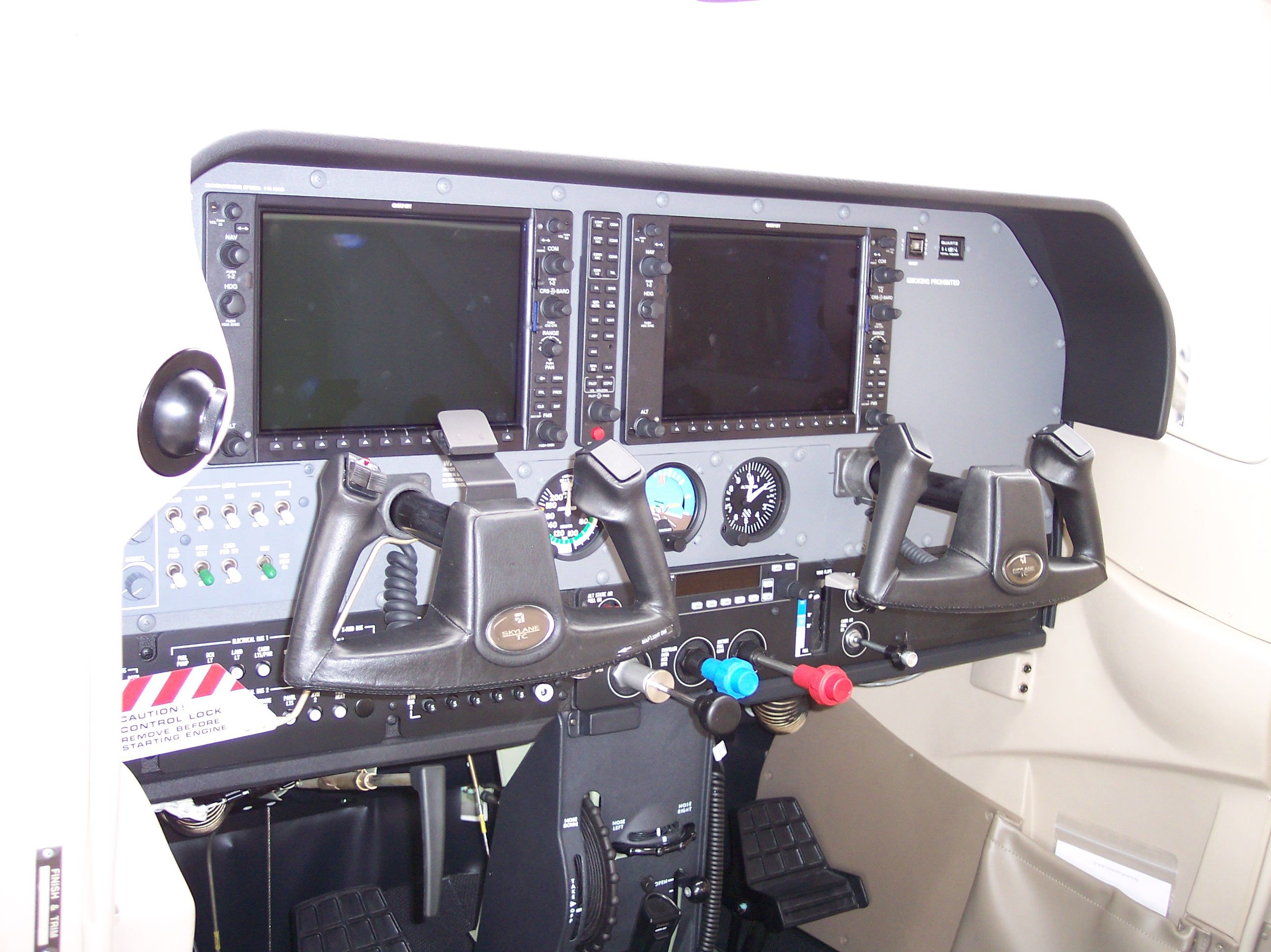
Glass cockpit in a Cessna 182

Many modern general aviation (GA) aircraft are available with glass cockpits. Systems such as the Garmin G1000 are now available on many new GA aircraft, including the classic Cessna 172 and more modern Cirrus SR22. Many small aircraft can also be modified post-production to replace analogue instruments.

Glass cockpits are also popular as a retrofit for older private jets and turboprops such as Dassault Falcons, Raytheon Hawkers, Bombardier Challengers, Cessna Citations, Gulfstreams, King Airs, Learjets, Astras, and many others. Aviation service companies work closely with equipment manufacturers to address the needs of the owners of these aircraft.

=== Consumer, research, hobby, and recreational aviation ===
Today, smartphones and tablets use apps to remotely control complex devices, e.g. by Wi-Fi radio interface, demonstrating how the "glass cockpit" idea can be applied to consumer devices. Applications include toy-grade UAVs which use the display and touch screen to employ every aspect of the "glass cockpit" for instrument display, and fly-by-wire for aircraft control.

=== Spaceflight ===
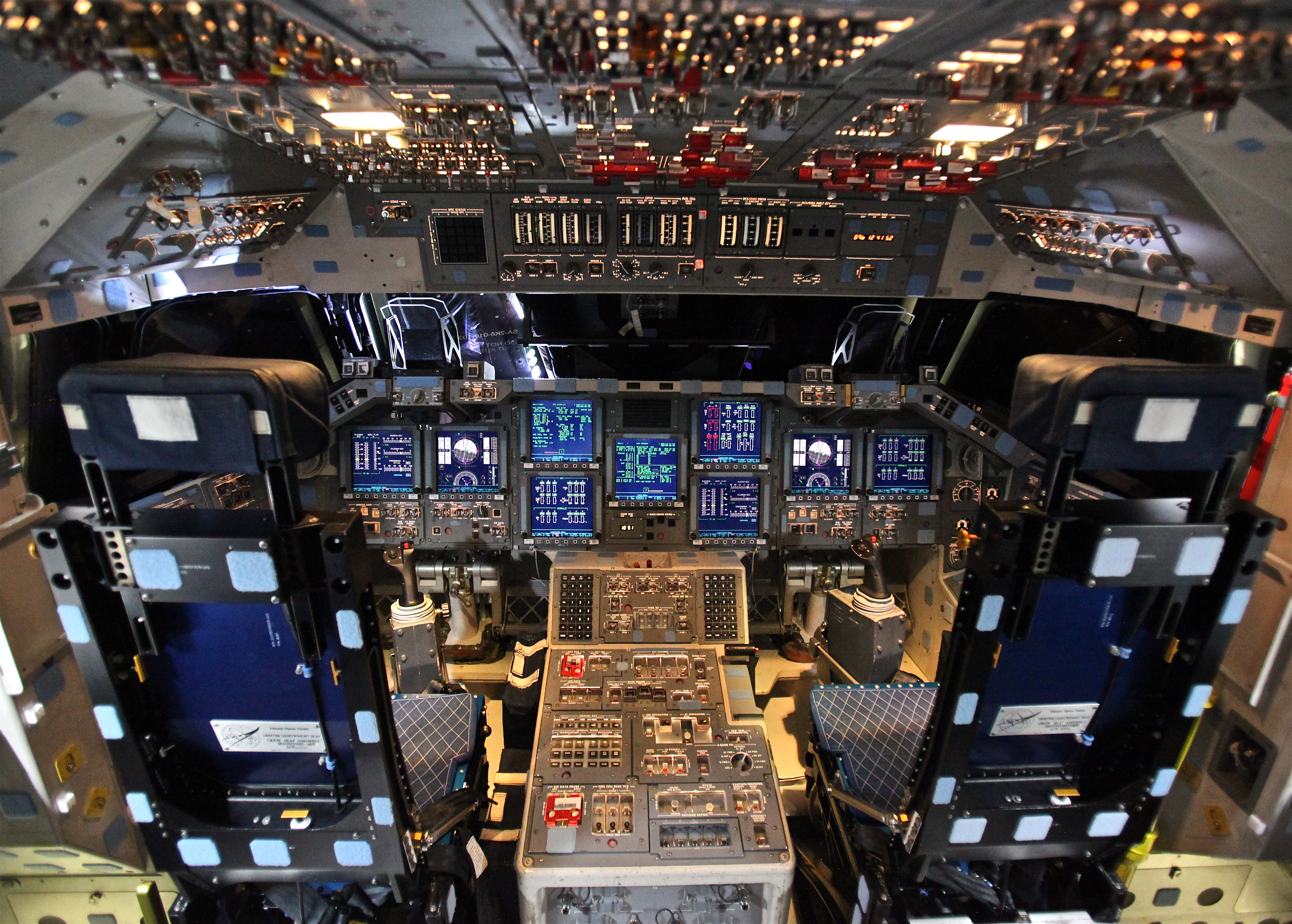
The retrofitted glass cockpit of Space Shuttle Endeavour

The glass cockpit idea made news in 1980s trade magazines, like Aviation Week & Space Technology, when NASA announced that it would be replacing most of the electro-mechanical flight instruments in the space shuttles with glass cockpit components. The articles mentioned how glass cockpit components had the added benefit of being a few hundred pounds lighter than the original flight instruments and support systems used in the Space Shuttles. The Space Shuttle Atlantis was the first orbiter to be retrofitted with a glass cockpit in 2000 with the launch of STS-101. Columbia was the second orbiter with a glass cockpit on STS-109 in 2002, followed by Discovery in 2005 with STS-114, and Endeavour in 2007 with STS-118.

NASA's Orion spacecraft uses a glass cockpit derived from the Boeing 787 Dreamliner.

== Safety ==
As aircraft operation depends on glass cockpit systems, flight crews must be trained to deal with failures. The Airbus A320 family has seen fifty incidents where several flight displays were lost.

On 25 January 2008, United Airlines Flight 731 experienced a serious glass-cockpit blackout, losing half of the Electronic Centralised Aircraft Monitor (ECAM) displays as well as all radios, transponders, Traffic Collision Avoidance System (TCAS), and attitude indicators. The pilots were able to land at Newark Airport without radio contact in good weather and daylight conditions.

Airbus has offered an optional fix, which the US National Transportation Safety Board (NTSB) has suggested to the US Federal Aviation Administration (FAA) as mandatory, but the FAA has yet to make it a requirement. A preliminary NTSB factsheet is available. Due to the possibility of a blackout, glass cockpit aircraft also have an integrated standby instrument system that includes (at a minimum) an artificial horizon, altimeter and airspeed indicator. It is electronically separate from the main instruments and can run for several hours on a backup battery.

In 2010, the NTSB published a study done on 8,000 general aviation light aircraft. The study found that, although aircraft equipped with glass cockpits had a lower overall accident rate, they also had a larger chance of being involved in a fatal accident. The NTSB Chairman said in response to the study:

Training is clearly one of the key components to reducing the accident rate of light planes equipped with glass cockpits, and this study clearly demonstrates the life and death importance of appropriate training on these complex systems... While the technological innovations and flight management tools that glass cockpit-equipped airplanes bring to the general aviation community should reduce the number of fatal accidents, we have not—unfortunately—seen that happen.

== See also ==
- Cockpit display system
- Primary flight display
- Electronic flight instrument system
- ARINC 661
- Electronic instrument cluster
- Head-up display
- Information overload
