= Avionics bay =

Compartment in an aircraft

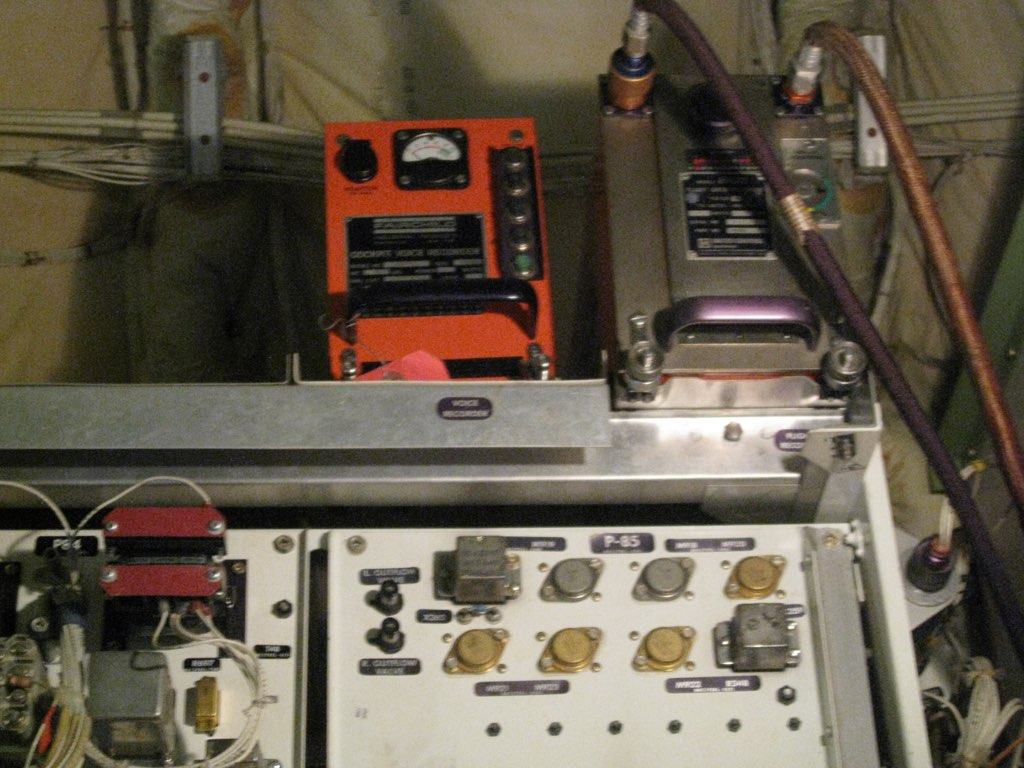
Flight recorder (orange) in the aft equipment center of Boeing 747

Avionics bay, also known as E&E bay or electronic equipment bay in aerospace engineering is known as compartment in an aircraft that houses the avionics and other electronic equipment, such as flight control computers, navigation systems, communication systems, and other electronic equipment essential for the operation. It is designed to be modular with individual components that can be easily removed and replaced in case of failure and is designed to be highly reliable and fault-tolerant with various backup systems.

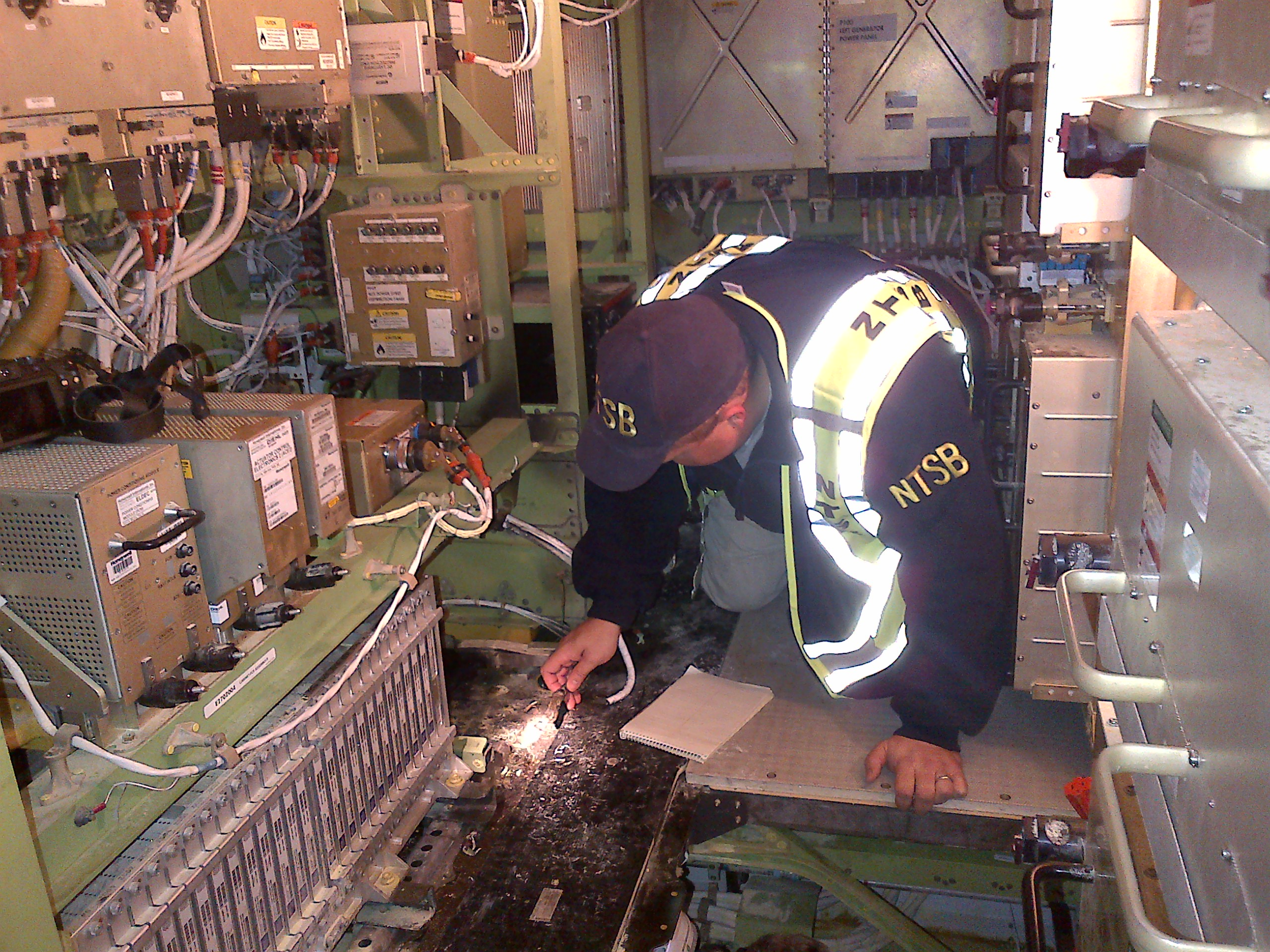
Battery fire being investigated in the Aft Electronics Bay of Boeing 787

In larger commercial airplanes, the main avionics compartment is typically located in the forward section of the aircraft under the cockpit. The purpose of its location is to provide easy access to the avionics and other electronic equipment for maintenance and repair.

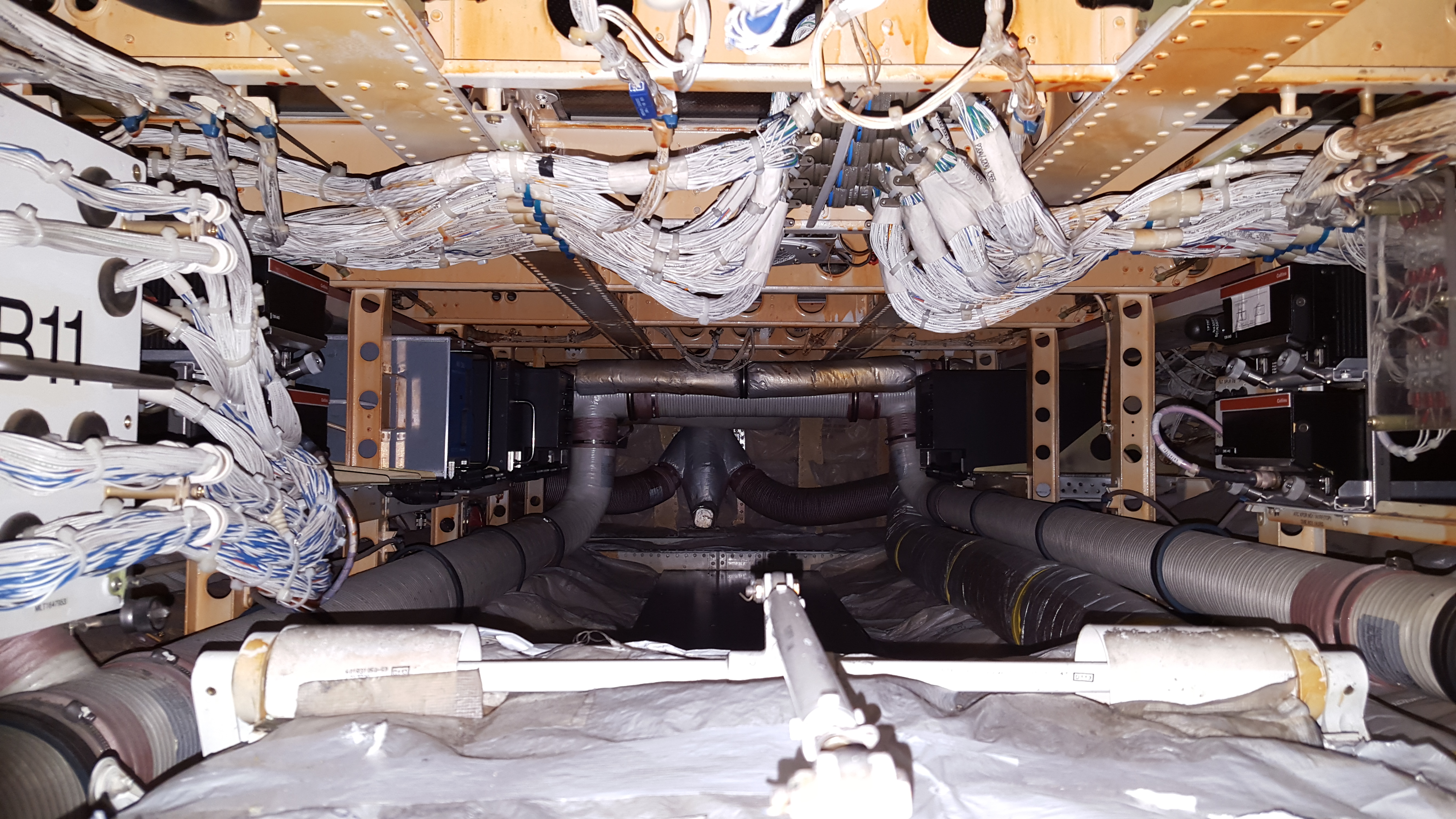
Avionics bay of a passenger aircraft

For example, on larger aircraft such as the Boeing 747-400, the avionics bays are divided into 3 parts, the main equipment center (MEC), the center equipment center (CEC) and the aft equipment center (AEC).

== Components ==
Typically avionics bays contain plug-in modules for:

- Flight Control Computer (FCC)
- Autopilot
- Automatic flight director system (AFDS)
  - Autothrottle system (A/T)
  - Mode control panel (MCP)
  - Flight management computer (FMC)
- Primary flight computers (PFC)
- Actuator control electronics (ACE)
- Flight data recorder
- Cockpit voice recorder
- Battery and battery charger

The avionics bay also contains the oxygen tanks for the pilots in case of a cabin depressurization

== Thermal management in spacecraft ==
In spacecraft, smoke detection is not practical for avionics bays as there is no forced airflow in the compartment. Suppressants, such as Halon, operate by either chemically interrupting the combustion process or by reducing the oxygen concentration within the bay's atmosphere.

== In popular culture ==
The outer door of the avionics bay of a 747-200 was used as a way to deploy military personnel into a hijacked aircraft in the movie Executive Decision.
