= Cockpit display system =

Aircraft pilot interface

A cockpit display systems (CDS) is an avionics software system that provides the visible (and audible) portion of the human–machine interface (HMI) of modern aircraft's glass cockpit.

== History ==
Prior to the 1970s, cockpits did not typically use any electronic instruments or displays. Improvements in computer technology, the need for enhancement of situational awareness in more complex environments, and the rapid growth of commercial air transportation, together with continued military competitiveness, led to increased levels of integration in the cockpit.

The average transport aircraft in the mid-1970s had more than one hundred cockpit instruments and controls, and the primary flight instruments were already crowded with indicators, crossbars, and symbols, and the growing number of cockpit elements were competing for cockpit space and pilot attention.

== Architecture ==
Glass cockpits routinely include high-resolution multi-color displays (often LCD displays) that present information relating to the various aircraft systems (such as flight management) in an integrated way. Integrated Modular Avionics (IMA) architecture allows for the integration of the cockpit instruments and displays at the hardware and software level to be maximized.

CDS software typically uses API code to integrate with the platform (such as OpenGL to access the graphics drivers for example). This software may be written manually or with the help of COTS tools such as VAPS, VAPS XT from PACE, GL Studio, or SCADE Display.

Standards such as ARINC 661 specify the integration of the CDS at the software level with the aircraft system applications (called User Applications or UA).

== See also ==
- Acronyms and abbreviations in avionics
