= Design Eye Position =

In the design of human-machine user interfaces (HMIs or UIs), the Design Eye Position (DEP) is the position from which the user is intended to view the workstation for an optimal view of the visual interface. The Design Eye Position represents the ideal but notional location of the operator's view, and is usually expressed as a monocular point midway between the pupils of the average user. The DEP may also allow for a standardisation of monocular and binocular "Field of View" and may be integrated into the CAD/CAM design system used to define the workstation build.

The DEP is particularly important in those operator workstations, such as the cockpit of a military fast jet, where an accurate reading of information and symbols on displays may be critical. When designing such user interfaces, the DEP is used as the reference point for the location of items (e.g., displays or controls) within the interface.

== Military Aviation ==
With collimated displays, such as the cockpit Head Up Display, the projected symbology is aligned very precisely with the outside world to allow for precise delivery of weapons and also for safe landing. Unless located at the Design Eye Position, the pilot cannot see the symbology as it is effectively focussed at infinity. Similarly, Head Down Displays will usually be angled precisely towards the DEP so that all symbols may be equally visible to the pilot without parallax or other display distortion errors.

Pilots who are below or above the 50% percentile point for sitting height, i.e. not of average stature, may need to adjust the seat in order to attain the DEP, even if this means compromising their optimal reach envelope. This is why, for example, rudder pedals may need to be adjustable.

== See also ==
- Overillumination
