= Apache Batik =

Software library written in Java

Batik

- Screenshot Batik running Solitaire Sample
- Developer: Apache Software Foundation
- Stable release: 1.19 / May 6, 2025; 6 months ago
- Repository: github.com/apache/xmlgraphics-batik
- Written in: Java
- Operating system: Cross-platform
- Type: Scalable Vector Graphics (SVG)
- License: Apache License 2.0
- Website: xmlgraphics.apache.org/batik

Batik is a pure-Java library that can be used to render, generate, and manipulate SVG graphics. IBM supported the project and then donated the code to the Apache Software Foundation, where other companies and teams decided to join efforts. Batik provides a set of core modules that provide functionality to:

- Render and dynamically modify SVG content,
- Transcode SVG content to some raster Graphics file formats, such as PNG, JPEG and TIFF,
- Transcode Windows Metafiles to SVG (WMF or Windows Metafile Format is the vector format used by Microsoft Windows applications),
- And manage scripting and user events on SVG documents.

The Batik distribution also contains a ready-to-use SVG browser (called Squiggle) making use of the above modules.

The name of the library comes from the Batik painting technique.

== Status ==
Batik was long the most conformant existing SVG 1.1 implementation, with the 1.7 version passing almost 94% of the W3C SVG 1.1 tests, which at the time was just a small fraction behind Opera in SVG conformance. Today all the major web browsers support SVG 2 while Batik remains on 1.1.

Version 1.7, made available on January 10, 2008, had an "almost full" implementation of the current state of the sXBL specification, a nearly complete implementation of SVG declarative animation SMIL features, and some of the SVG 1.2 late October 2004 working draft, although that version of SVG was dropped for SVG 2 (see SVG's Development history).

== See also ==
- Scalable Vector Graphics
- Synchronized Multimedia Integration Language
- sXBL: a mechanism for defining the presentation and interactive behaviour of elements described in a namespace other than SVG files
