= Integrated standby instrument system =

Backup instrument display for aircraft

An integrated standby instrument system (ISIS) is an electronic aircraft instrument. It is intended to serve as backup in case of a failure of the standard glass cockpit instrumentation, allowing pilots to continue to receive key flight-related information. Prior to the use of ISIS, this was performed by individual redundant mechanical instrumentation instead. Such systems have become common to be installed in various types of aircraft, ranging from airliners to helicopters and smaller general aviation aircraft. While it is common for new-built aircraft to be outfitted with ISIS, numerous operators have opted to have their fleets retrofitted with such apparatus as well. Typically there are 3 instruments: an airspeed indicator, an altimeter and an attitude indicator.

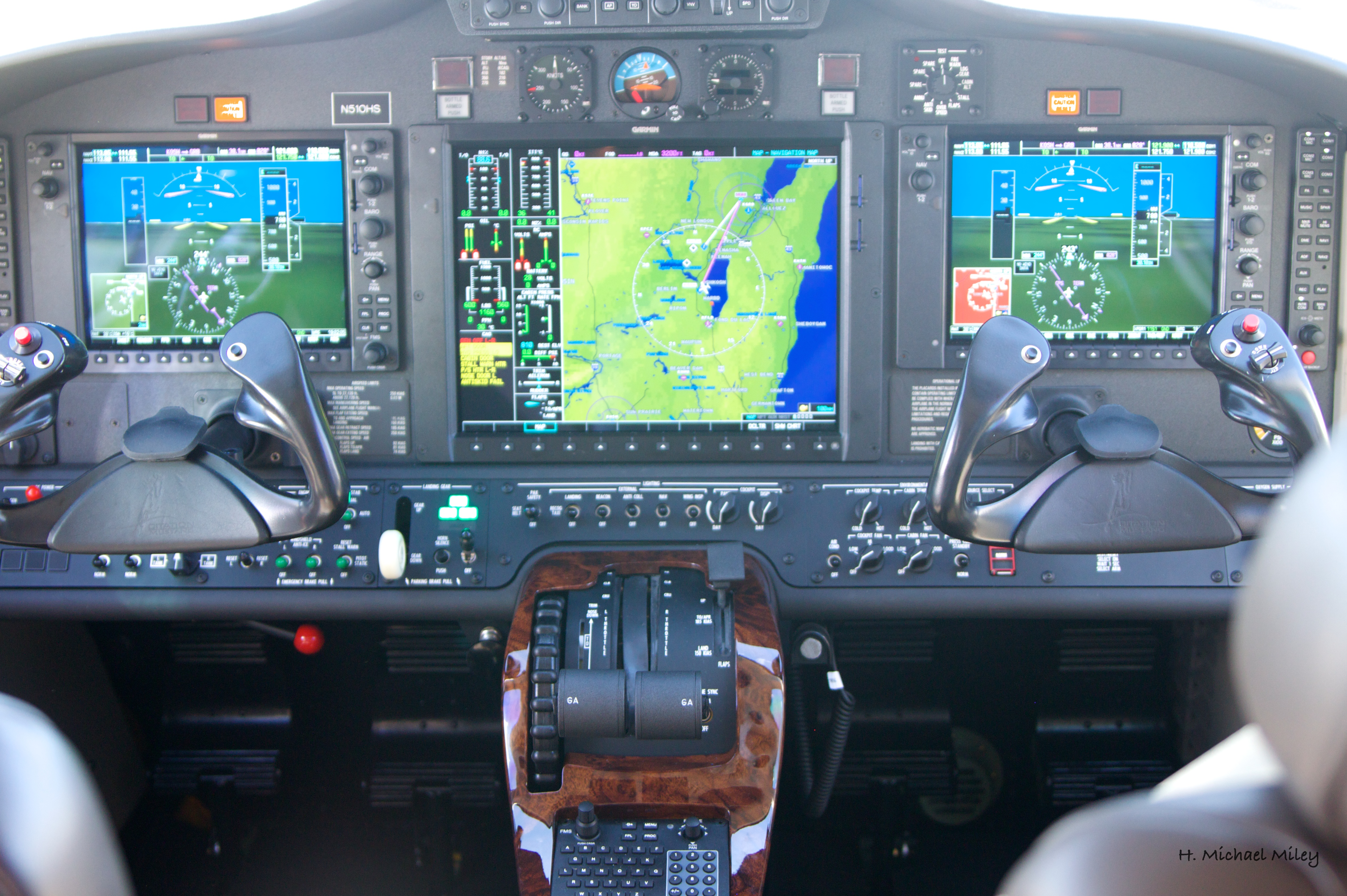
In this Cessna Citation Mustang, there are a few standby instruments on the top of the middle LCD.

== Details ==
An ISIS is designed to combine the functions of separate equivalent mechanical instruments that had previously been included as backup in such cockpits, including altimeter, airspeed indicator, and attitude indicator. Various aspects of ISIS are defined by its function of being a backup to conventional instrumentation. In accordance with this principle, it has been designed to operate with a high level of availability and reliability, as well as being as independent as possible from the aircraft's primary instrumentation and sensors alike. It is commonplace for an ISIS to work in conjunction with provisions for auxiliary power (typically a battery unit), as well as harnessing embedded sensors for its readings wherever possible. When all onboard instrumentation is performing normally, the readings indicated by an ISIS are identical to those of the primary flight display. Advantages presented by ISIS over traditional systems include increased safety, greater ease of operation, and reduced operating costs.

A number of aircraft have been produced with relatively sophisticated integrated standby systems which may include additional functions. For example, the Rockwell Collins Pro Line 21 flight deck, which is fitted to aircraft such as the Cessna Citation XLS+ business jet, features a standby navigation display and engine gauges. Thales Group produces its own ISIS, which is installed on the Airbus A320 narrow-body and Airbus A330 wide-body airliners, among other aircraft; it allowed for one single instrument to replace four standby instruments that had been traditionally used. Thales also produced an Integrated Electronic Standby Instrument (IESI) dedicated for use on helicopters; in excess of 6,000 such units have reportedly been sold as of July 2020. Another such system is manufactured by L3Harris Technologies, intended for both helicopters and general aviation purposes. Additional companies specialising in avionics, such as GE Aviation, Smiths Group, and Meggitt, have also marketed ranges of standby instrumentation using both standalone and ISIS-compliance principles.

Several companies have produced patentable innovations related to ISIS, including large aerospace players such as Airbus Group. In addition to such technology being adopted upon new-build aircraft, several operators have opted to retrofit their existing aircraft fleets with current generation ISIS, such as UPS's Airbus A300 freighters. Along these lines, Rockwell Collins developed a retrofit package for the Boeing 757 and Boeing 767 that incorporates ISIS. During the 2010s, the cost of performing such cockpit display retrofits reportedly dropped substantially.

== See also ==
- Index of aviation articles
