= Label (control) =

Labels being used to indicate the purpose of a spinner box, as well as for a category heading.

A label is a graphical control element which displays text on a form. It is usually a static control; having no interactivity. A label is generally used to identify a nearby text box or other widget. Some labels can respond to events such as mouse clicks, allowing the text of the label to be copied, but this is not standard user-interface practice. Labels usually cannot be given the focus.

There is also a similar control known as a link label. Unlike a standard label, a link label looks and acts like a hyperlink, and can be selected and activated. This control may have features such as changing colour when clicked or hovered over.
