= Mode control panel =

In aviation, the mode control panel (MCP) is an instrument panel that controls an advanced autopilot and related systems such as an automated flight-director system (AFDS).

The MCP contains controls that allow the crew of the aircraft to select which parts of the aircraft's flight are to be controlled automatically. In modern MCPs, there are many different modes of automation available. The MCP can be used to instruct the autopilot to hold a specific altitude, to change altitudes at a specific rate, to hold a specific heading, to turn to a new heading, to follow the directions of a flight management computer (FMC), and so on. The MCP is actually independent of the autopilot—it simply sets the mode in which the autopilot operates, but the autopilot itself (e.g., an AFDS) is a separate aircraft system. The MCP often interacts with both the AFDS or autopilot and the FMC(s).

MCPs are usually found in advanced aircraft intended for commercial use, especially jet airliners. They are often mounted on the glare shield, a small panel that overhangs the main instrument panel of the aircraft and also functions as a shield against outside glare.

== See also ==
- Electronic flight instrument system
